This article documents the timeline of the COVID-19 pandemic in Indonesia in 2020.

February 

 2 February – The Indonesian government evacuated 243 Indonesian nationals from Wuhan, China. The repatriated Indonesians were placed under quarantine in the Natuna Islands but were not tested as they were asymptomatic.
 24 February – Nine Indonesians on board the Diamond Princess tested positive for the virus and were moved to treatment facilities in Japan. The Indonesian government repatriated and then quarantined the remaining 68 crew members, along with the 188 from the World Dream, onto the uninhabited Sebaru Kecil Island in the Thousand Islands off the coast of Jakarta.

March 
 2 March – President Joko Widodo confirmed the first two cases of COVID-19 in the country in a televised statement. According to the Minister of Health Terawan Agus Putranto, the patients contracted the virus from an infected Japanese person in Depok who was later tested positive in Malaysia. Both Indonesian patients were subsequently hospitalized at Sulianti Saroso Infection Center Hospital, North Jakarta.
 6 March – Indonesia had only tested 450 individuals out of its 270 million population.
 7 March – One of the crew evacuated from the Diamond Princess was suspected of contracting the disease and was subsequently transferred to an isolation unit at Persahabatan Central General Hospital, East Jakarta.
 8 March
 A 50-year-old woman from Jakarta tested positive in Melbourne, Australia. She began showing symptoms two days after flying to Perth from Jakarta on 27 February and saw a GP four days after arriving in Melbourne on 2 March.
 The government of Indonesia announced two more confirmed cases. One patient was infected through close contact with case #1, the other patient was a crew member of the Diamond Princess.
 9 March – Indonesia confirmed 13 new cases of COVID-19 infection, 2 of them being foreigners. The Indonesian government decided not to disclose the detection location of the patient and the treatment facility used.
 10 March
 2 patients who were previously confirmed to be positive were subsequently reported as negative, substantiating an explanation made by an Indonesian government representative. The two patients were to be discharged, should further test confirm their negative status.
 Indonesia confirmed 8 new cases of COVID-19 infection, 2 of them foreigners.
 A suspected COVID-19 patient fled from Persahabatan Central General Hospital. She was later confirmed as positive of the virus and has returned to the hospital.
 11 March
 Case 25 died, the first death in Indonesia. The victim was a British national and died in Bali's Sanglah Hospital.
 Indonesia confirmed 7 new cases of COVID-19 infection, all of them imported cases.
 12 March
 5 cases recovered.
 Indonesian Labour Minister Ida Fauziah mandated that all Indonesian companies provide their employees with coronavirus prevention equipment, such as face masks and hand sanitizer.
 13 March
 3 coronavirus-linked deaths were reported, 1 case in Solo, Central Java. The other two were undisclosed.
 Indonesia confirmed 35 new cases of COVID-19 infection, totalling 69 cases.
 The first affected medical worker died on 13 March.
 14 March
 The Indonesian government confirmed 27 new cases of COVID-19, a total of 96 cases.
 This date also marks the first time that the government announced the locations with confirmed coronavirus cases. Locations with confirmed coronavirus cases included every district in Jakarta, Tangerang in Banten, Bandung in West Java, Solo in Central Java, Yogyakarta in Special Region of Yogyakarta, Pontianak in West Kalimantan, Manado in North Sulawesi and Bali.
 3 further patients recovered, for a total of 8 recovered patients.
 1 patient died, bringing the total to 5 deaths.
 Indonesian Minister of Transportation, Budi Karya Sumadi tested positive for COVID-19. A few days prior, on 10 March, Budi Karya was diagnosed with typhoid fever after travelling to Wakatobi, Toraja, Luwuk, Makassar, Parepare, Kertajati, and Indramayu. His travel history included travel to Kertajati International Airport on 1 March that had acted as an evacuation centre for the repatriated crew of the Diamond Princess. One of the crew of Diamond Princess tested positive for COVID-19 on 8 March 2020. On 11 March, Budi had also met with the Dutch Minister of Infrastructure and Water Management Cora Van Nieuwenhuize.
 15 March
 Indonesia confirmed 21 new cases of COVID-19 infection, 19 in Jakarta and 2 in Central Java, a total of 117 cases.
 Indonesian President Joko Widodo was said to be undergoing a COVID-19 test in the evening.
 16 March
 Vice President Ma'ruf Amin and Home Minister Tito Karnavian had been tested negative on the COVID-19 test.
 Indonesia confirmed 17 new cases of infection, in a total of 134 cases. 14 new cases in Jakarta, 1 new case in Central Java, 1 new case in Banten, and 1 new case in West Java.
 Indonesia announced that it would start to quarantine asymptomatic COVID-19 patients in their own home.
 17 March
 In response to the growing number of COVID-19 cases in Indonesia, the Indonesian National Board for Disaster Management declared an emergency period for 91 days, effective until 29 May 2020.
 The Indonesian government announced 38 new cases of COVID-19, bringing the total number of infections to 172.
 1 case recovered, adding to a total of 9 cases recovered.
 2 patients died (1 in Semarang and another one were unknown), in a total of 7 deaths.
 There were mistakes in the counting of the deaths. The Minister of Health reported that the death numbers were still 5, the same as that on 14 March, while two new deaths were reported in the early morning by Governor of Central Java and Governor of Banten. The total number of deaths should be 7.
 18 March
 Indonesia confirmed 55 new cases of COVID-19 infection, bringing the total up to 227 cases.
 12 patients died, the number of deaths has now increased to 19. The 19 fatalities mean that Indonesia has now recorded the highest death toll among Southeast Asian countries hit by the coronavirus to date. Indonesia's case fatality rate has reached 8.37% which is double the world case fatality rate (4.07%).
 7 Indonesians tested positive for COVID-19 in India were part of a 10-member team who travelled to Karimnagar for a religious tour.
 After 2 positive cases, Governor of West Kalimantan Sutarmidji declared an "extraordinary event" until further notice.
 19 March
 Joko Widodo announced 7 critical points (mass rapid tests, incentive for medical personnel, involve religious people, stop exporting medical equipment, stop holiday, incentive for small and medium enterprises, increase food stocks) to accelerate the elimination of COVID-19 outbreak in Indonesia.
 Indonesia announced 82 new cases, bringing the total to 309 cases. However, it was revised to 308 cases.
 4 more patients in DKI Jakarta announced cured from COVID-19.
 The import of Rapid Test Tools (15 minutes – 3 hours) by Rajawali Nusantara Indonesia from China had been approved by Ministry of Health.
 President Joko Widodo and wife, Iriana, tested negative on the COVID-19 test.
 Indonesian Chief of Police Idham Azis published notice for all policeman to disperse crowds anywhere at anytime, including restaurants, matrimony and religious services, and to deny permits for large events.
 The government cancelled a Tablighi Jamaat event in the Gowa Regency in Sulawesi. Thousands had already gathered despite a call for it to be cancelled earlier. A similar gathering in Kuala Lumpur in late February had caused a large outbreak of COVID-19 cases in Malaysia including 3 Indonesians.
 20 March
 Indonesia announced 60 new cases, bringing the total to 369 cases. Indonesia also announced 17 recovered and 32 deaths, an increase of 7 deaths.
 Indonesia Minister of State-Owned Enterprises Erick Thohir said that Indonesia has enough drugs for 60,000 COVID-19 patients, and by the end of March could supply up to 4.7 million face masks.
 President Joko Widodo instructed his officials to shift budgetary priorities. Less prioritized budgets from the state budget (APBN) and regional budget (APBD) are to be reallocated to fund government efforts in combating the coronavirus pandemic, increasing the safety net for Indonesians, and to incentivize small and medium businesses. He also promised to begin deploying rapid coronavirus testing, prioritizing South Jakarta as the worst-hit area.
 Governor Anies Baswedan declared a state of emergency in Jakarta for the next 14 days (2 April). Anies also urged businesses to suspend operations, and he urged all stakeholders to take drastic actions to prevent the spread of the disease during the state of emergency.
 After 9 positive cases of COVID-19, Khofifah Indar Parawansa declared a state of emergency for East Java.
 Mayor of Bogor, Bima Arya had been tested positive for COVID-19 after a trip to Turkey. Bima and all officials who went on the trip will comply with health protocols that include a minimum 14-day isolation at Bogor Senior Hospital.
 Detri Warmanto had been tested positive for COVID-19. He is the son-in-law of the Minister of Administrative and Bureaucratic Reform, Tjahjo Kumolo.
 Istiqlal mosque halted Friday prayer for 2 weeks after Anies Baswedan and Indonesian Council of Ulama requested to halt mass religious activities in Jakarta.
 21 March
 Indonesian Air Force flew its C-130 Hercules (A-1333) to the Chinese city of Shanghai on Saturday to pick up approximately 9 tonnes of medical equipment. The route was Malang-Natuna-Hainan-Shanghai. The equipment included disposable masks, N95 masks, protective clothing, goggles, gloves, shoe covers, infrared thermometers, and surgical caps.
 One person died after having a fever and headaches. The victim, a Russian citizen, died in his boarding house on Jalan Bukit Tunggal Gang 5, West Denpasar.
 Indonesia announced 81 new cases, totalling 450 cases of COVID-19 infection. Indonesia also announced 20 recovered and 38 deaths, an increase of 6 deaths since 20 March 2020.
 22 March
 Indonesia Medical Association (IDI) announced 6 doctors had contracted with COVID-19.
 Indonesia announced 64 new cases, a total of 514 cases.
 23 March
 Indonesia announced 65 new cases, bringing the total to 579 cases.
 President Joko Widodo inaugurated the first COVID-19 makeshift hospital in the country at the former athlete's village for the 2018 Asian Games in Kemayoran, Central Jakarta. It was slated to be fitted with 3000 beds for patients requiring isolation. Later reports suggested that it would house only 1,800 beds for the first phase.
 24 March
 President Joko Widodo announced the cancellation of the annual national examination (Ujian Nasional) for all education levels, except Vocational High School (Sekolah Menengah Kejuruan, SMK) that had been done in almost half of all schools in the country. He also announced measures to ease motorcycle loans for one year.
 Indonesia confirmed 107 more cases, 686 in total.
 25 March
 The Indonesian Ministry of Transportation discouraged everyone from travelling home for the Eid al-Fitr holiday to contain the spread of the virus.
 Indonesia confirmed 105 more cases and corrected the data from the previous day. It should have been 685, while the previous day's data recorded 686. One patient's name was mistakenly registered in two hospitals. The total number of cases became 790.
 26 March
 Indonesia announced 103 new cases, bringing the total number to 893.
 Researchers have estimated that there could be thousands of hidden infections across the country.
 40 tonnes of medical equipment from China were transported to Jakarta.
 27 March
 Indonesia confirmed 153 new positive cases, 1,046 in total. They also announced 9 deaths and 11 recoveries.
 Beringharjo and Tanah Abang markets were closed to prevent COVID-19.
 Coordinating Minister for Political, Legal, and Security Affairs of Indonesia Mahfud MD said that a special law about local lockdown is currently in the works.
 28 March
 Indonesia announced 109 more cases, bringing the total number to 1,155.
 A number of cities decided to issue local lockdowns, such as the city of Tegal in Central Java and the province of Papua.
 Indonesia AirAsia suspended all flights from 1 April until at least 21 April for domestic flights and 17 May for international flights.
 29 March
 Indonesia confirmed another 130 new cases, 1,285 in total.
 The state railway company Kereta Api Indonesia cancelled 28 routes from Jakarta for the month of April.
 30 March
 Indonesia confirmed 129 new cases, bringing the total number to 1,414.
 Jokowi ordered large-scale social restrictions coupled with 'civil emergency' policies.
 31 March
 Indonesia confirmed 114 new cases, 1,528 in total.
 President Joko Widodo declared public health emergency and invoked the police to enforce large-scale social distancing policy, in addition to allocate IDR 405 trillion for eradication of COVID-19 and cushioning of social and economical effects due to the pandemic, and announced stimulus for the low-middle class society.

April 
 1 April
 Indonesia confirmed 149 new cases, bringing the total number to 1,677.
 300 police students at Sekolah Pembentukan Perwira (Setukpa) Lembaga Pendidikan Polri (Lemdikpol) in Sukabumi were quarantined for 14 days after positive rapid test results.
 2 April
 Indonesia confirmed 113 new cases, 1,790 in total.
 Indonesia banned foreigners from entering its border. Its citizens returning from abroad had to provide health report and did compulsory self-quarantine.
 Minister of Law and Human Rights Yasonna Laoly said he would release more than 30,000 prisoners to avoid mass coronavirus infections in Indonesia's overcrowded jails. It received a lot of critics especially for those who did corruption. However, it was declared that they would not release prisoners convicted for corruption, illegal logging, terrorism, drug crimes, gross human rights crimes or transnational organized crimes.
 3 April – Indonesia confirmed 196 new cases, bringing the total number to 1,986.
 4 April – Indonesia announced 106 new cases, 2,092 in total.
 5 April – Indonesia confirmed 181 new cases, bringing the total number to 2,273.
 6 April
 Indonesia had tested 11,242 specimens, in which 8,000 were negative.
 Indonesia announced 218 additional cases, 2,491 in total.
 7 April
 Indonesia confirmed 247 new cases, 2,738 in total.
 The Jakarta administration revealed it had buried 639 people according to the protocols for burial of people either suspected or confirmed as having been infected with COVID-19.
 Application for large-scale social restrictions in Jakarta was approved and would start from 10 April until 24 April and could be extended for 14 days. The ministry wrote in a ministerial decree that data had shown a significant increase in, and a rapid spread of COVID-19 cases, accompanied by evidence of local transmission in Jakarta.
 Only 36 in every million people were being tested for the coronavirus in Indonesia, making it the fourth worst in testing rate among countries with a 50 million population or above.
 8 April – Indonesia confirmed 218 new cases, bringing the total number to 2,956.
 9 April
 Indonesia announced 337 additional cases, 3,293 in total.
 Gorontalo announced its first case. By 9 April night, cases have been confirmed in all provinces in Indonesia.
 The Public Works and Public Housing Ministry prepared three additional towers (tower 2, 4, and 5) at Wisma Atlet makeshift hospital to add COVID-19 patient rooms and provided a decent place for doctors and paramedics who work 24 hours.
 Online ride-hailing company Gojek and digital healthcare company Halodoc were set to hold free rapid tests to detect the coronavirus (COVID-19) for the public as initial screenings.
 10 April
 Indonesia confirmed 219 new cases, 3,512 in total.
 Online ride-hailing companies, Gojek and Grab, were no longer providing motorcycle taxi (ojek) service on its apps as Jakarta started imposing the large-scale social restrictions policy.
 Indonesia had tested 19,500 specimens based on polymerase chain reaction method.
 11 April
 Indonesia announced 330 new cases, bringing the total number to 3,842.
 Preemployment card was launched to help those who are in economy difficulty due to the pandemic.
 12 April
 Indonesia had tested 27,000 specimens.
 Large-scale social restrictions would be in effect in Depok, Bogor city and regency, and Bekasi city and regency, all in West Java province, from 15 April for at least two weeks.
 Indonesia announced 399 additional cases. The total number was 4,241.
 13 April
 Indonesia confirmed 316 new cases, 4,557 in total.
 Application for large-scale social restrictions in Tangerang city and regency as well as South Tangerang in Banten province were approved and would be effective starting from Saturday, 18 April. This means the social restrictions would encompass all of Jakarta metropolitan area.
 Application for large-scale social restrictions in Pekanbaru, Riau was approved and would be in effect from Friday, 17 April. Curfew was in effect from 20:00 to 05:00.
 President Joko Widodo declared COVID-19 as a national disaster.
 14 April
 Indonesia announced 282 additional cases, bringing the total number to 4,839.
 For the first time ever, Indonesia published the number of COVID-19 suspects. As of 14 April, there were 139,137 people under monitoring (ODP) and 10,482 patients under supervision (PDP).
 15 April
 At least 36,431 specimens from 33,001 people had been tested so far. There were 165,549 people under monitoring (ODP) and 11,165 patients under supervision (PDP) from 196 municipalities and regencies.
 Indonesia announced 297 additional cases, bringing the total number to 5,136.
 16 April
 Indonesia announced 380 new cases, 5,516 in total from 202 municipalities and regencies. For the first time ever, the number of recoveries exceeded the total number of deaths.
 In addition, 169.446 people were under monitoring and 11,873 patients were under supervision. 39,706 specimens had been tested so far.
 46 medical staffs in dr. Kariadi Hospital in Semarang had been tested positive for COVID-19 infection. They were put under isolation in Kesambi Hijau Hotel.
 17 April
 At least 42,000 specimens from 37,000 people had been tested in 34 laboratories so far. There were at least 173,000 people under monitoring (ODP) and 12,000 patients under supervision (PDP).
 Indonesia announced 407 additional cases, 5,923 in total.
 Large-scale social restrictions for Bandung metropolitan area (Bandung municipality, Cimahi municipality, Bandung Regency, West Bandung Regency, Sumedang Regency), West Java, were approved and would be in effect from Wednesday, 22 April.
 Application for large-scale social restrictions for Makassar, South Sulawesi, the entire West Sumatra, and Tegal, Central Java were approved.
 18 April
 At least 45,000 specimens from 39,000 people had been tested in 34 laboratories so far. There were 176,344 people under monitoring (ODP) and 12,979 patients under supervision (PDP).
 Indonesia confirmed 325 additional cases, 6,248 in total.
 19 April
 At least 47,000 specimens from 42,000 people had been tested in 35 laboratories so far. There were at least 178,883 people under monitoring (ODP) and 15,646 patients under supervision (PDP) from 250 municipalities and regencies.
 Indonesia confirmed 327 additional cases, bringing the total number to 6,575.
 20 April
 49,767 specimens from 43,749 people had been tested in 36 laboratories so far. There were 181,770 people under monitoring (ODP) and 16,343 patients under supervision (PDP).
 Indonesia confirmed 185 additional cases, bringing the total number to 6,760.
 21 April
 Joko Widodo announced his decision to ban the Idul Fitri mudik (exodus) starting from 24 April to curb the spread of COVID-19 ahead of Ramadan.
 53,701 specimens from 46,173 people had been tested in 37 laboratories so far. There were 186,330 people under monitoring (ODP) and 16,763 patients under supervision (PDP) from 257 municipalities and regencies.
 Indonesia confirmed 375 additional cases, 7,135 in total.
 22 April
 At least 55,000 specimens from 47,000 people had been tested in 38 laboratories so far. There were 193,751 people under monitoring (ODP) and 17,754 patients under supervision (PDP) from 263 municipalities and regencies.
 Indonesia confirmed 283 additional cases, bringing the total number to 7,418.
 Large-scale social restrictions in Jakarta was extended for one month until 22 May.
 23 April
 59,935 specimens from 48,647 people had been tested in 43 laboratories so far. There were 195,948 people under monitoring (ODP) and 18,283 patients under supervision (PDP) from 267 municipalities and regencies.
 Indonesia announced 357 new cases, 7,775 in total.
 A new cluster was identified in Magetan Regency, East Java after at least 40 students from Temboro religious school were reactive to COVID-19 rapid tests. Subsequently, at least 60 positive cases were identified from this cluster all across Indonesia and other countries.
 24 April
 Indonesia banned intercity bus travel until 31 May, commercial and charter flights until 1 June, sea transportation until 8 June, and long-distance passenger trains until 15 June. Private transportations were not allowed to leave areas where at least one COVID-19 case was confirmed. However, toll roads and national roads remained open for freight traffic.
 64,054 specimens from 50,563 people had been tested in 45 laboratories so far. There were 197,951 people under monitoring (ODP) and 18,031 patients under supervision (PDP) from 273 municipalities and regencies.
 Indonesia announced 436 new cases, bringing the total number to 8,211.
 25 April
 At least 67,000 specimens from 52,000 people had been tested in 45 laboratories so far. There were 206,911 people under monitoring (ODP) and 19,084 patients under supervision (PDP) from 280 municipalities and regencies.
 Indonesia announced 396 additional cases, 8,607 in total.
 Governor of West Java Ridwan Kamil announced the ability of state-owned PT Biofarma to produce 50,000 PCR (polymerase chain reaction) test kits per week.
 26 April
 At least 72,000 specimens from 56,974 people had been tested in 46 laboratories so far. There were 209,040 people under monitoring (ODP) and 19,648 patients under supervision (PDP) from 282 municipalities and regencies.
 Indonesia announced 275 additional cases, bringing the total number to 8,882.
 27 April
 Head of the COVID-19 Response Acceleration Task Force Doni Monardo announced that the number of new cases in Jakarta has flattened thanks to the implementation of large-scale social restrictions.
 Spokesman of the COVID-19 Response Acceleration Task Force Achmad Yurianto announced further details of the COVID-19 death statistics. Age ranged from 41 to over 60, most with co-morbid illness such as hypertension, diabetes, cardiovascular and lung diseases.
 At least 75,157 specimens from 59,409 people had been tested in 46 laboratories so far. There were 210,199 people under monitoring (ODP) and 19,987 patients under supervision (PDP) from 288 municipalities and regencies.
 Indonesia announced 214 additional cases, 9,096 in total, 7,180 of which were under treatment.
 Passenger traffic on the ferry service between Merak in Java Island and Bakauheni in Sumatra was temporarily banned until 31 May. Freight traffic was still allowed to cross.
 28 April
 79,618 specimens from 62,544 people had been tested in 46 laboratories so far. There were 213,644 people under monitoring (ODP) and 20,428 patients under supervision (PDP) from 297 municipalities and regencies.
 Indonesia confirmed 415 new cases, bringing the total number to 9,511.
 Spokesman of Coronavirus Disease Mitigation Acceleration Task Force Achmad Yurianto announced further details of the age range of deceased cases. Of the 773 deaths recorded so far on this day, 351 were patients age 30 to 59, followed by 302 patients ages 60 to 79. Patients above 80 years old made up 27 of the cases and 34 deaths were recorded from patients under the age of 30.
 29 April
 86,985 specimens from 67,784 people had been tested in 89 laboratories so far. There were 221,750 people under monitoring (ODP) and 21,653 patients under supervision (PDP) from 297 municipalities and regencies.
 Indonesia announced 260 new cases, 9,771 in total, 7,596 of which were under treatment. 137 patients had recovered.
 30 April
 94,599 specimens from 72,531 people had been tested in 89 laboratories so far. There were 230,411 people under monitoring (ODP) and 21,827 patients under supervision (PDP) from 310 municipalities and regencies.
 Indonesia confirmed 347 new cases, bringing the total number to 10,118. 131 new recoveries and 8 new deaths were also recorded.

May 
 1 May
 102,305 specimens from 76,538 people had been tested in 89 laboratories. There were 233,120 people under monitoring (ODP) and 22,123 patients under supervision (PDP).
 Indonesia confirmed 433 new cases, bringing the total number to 10,551. 69 recoveries and 8 deaths were also recorded. 318 municipalities and regencies had reported at least one positive case.
 A new COVID-19 cluster was identified in Surabaya, East Java after at least 36 employees of the cigarette factory Sampoerna were COVID-19 positive. As of 3 May, the number of positive cases increased to 66.
 2 May
 107,943 specimens from 79,868 people had been tested in 89 laboratories. There were 235,035 people under monitoring (ODP) and 22,545 patients under supervision (PDP).
 Indonesia confirmed 292 new cases, bringing the total number to 10,843. 74 recoveries and 31 deaths were also recorded. 321 municipalities and regencies had reported at least one positive case.
 A village in Bangli Regency, Bali was isolated after at least 400 of its residents were found reactive to COVID-19.
 3 May
 112,965 specimens from 83,012 people had been tested in 89 laboratories. There were 236,369 people under monitoring (ODP) and 23,130 patients under supervision (PDP)
 Indonesia confirmed 349 new cases, bringing the total number to 11,192. 211 patients recovered and 14 died. 326 municipalities and regencies had been reported at least one positive case.
 Three passengers of the commuter line at Bogor train station were diagnosed positive with COVID-19 after a random PCR test.
 4 May
 116,861 specimens from 86,061 people had been tested in 89 laboratories. There were 238,178 people under monitoring (ODP) and 24,020 patients under supervision (PDP). Almost 200,000 of the people under monitoring were cleared.
 Indonesia confirmed 395 new cases, bringing the total number to 11,587. 78 people recovered, and 19 died. 326 municipalities and regencies had reported at least one positive case.
 5 May
 121,547 specimens from 88,924 people had been tested in 89 laboratories. There were 239,226 people under monitoring (ODP) and 26,408 patients under supervision (PDP).
 Indonesia confirmed 484 new cases, bringing the total number to 12,071. 243 people recovered and 8 died. 335 municipalities and regencies had reported at least one positive case.
 6 May
 128,383 specimens from 92,976 people had been tested in 89 laboratories. There were 240,726 people under monitoring (ODP) and 26,932 patients under supervision (PDP).
 Indonesia confirmed 367 new cases, bringing the total number to 12,438. 120 patients recovered and 23 died. 350 municipalities and regencies had reported at least one positive case.
 A new COVID-19 cluster was identified in Sleman Regency, Yogyakarta after 57 employees of Indogrosir wholesale market were reactive to a COVID-19 rapid test.
 After a random PCR test on 300 passengers of the commuter line at Bekasi train station, three were tested positive.
 7 May
 The Ministry of Transportation allowed intercity transportation to resume operation when transporting passengers for essential business, repatriation, or governmental purposes, but not mudik.
 134,151 specimens from 96,717 people had been tested. There were 243,455 people under monitoring (ODP) and 28,508 patients under supervision (PDP)
 Indonesia confirmed 338 new cases, bringing the total number to 12,776. 64 people recovered and 35 died. 354 municipalities and regencies had reported at least one positive case.
 Great Market in Padang, West Sumatra was closed after 44 of its vendors were positively diagnosed with COVID-19 and at least 1,000 of its vendors were tested.
 8 May
 143,781 specimens from 103,361 people had been tested, 143,453 of which using real time PCR and 328 using molecular rapid test. There were 244,480 people under monitoring (ODP) and 29,087 patients under supervision (PDP).
 Indonesia confirmed 336 new cases, bringing the total number to 13,112. 113 patients recovered while 13 patients deceased. 356 municipalities and regencies had reported at least one positive case.
 9 May
 150,887 specimens from 108,699 people had been tested, 150,493 of which using real time PCR and 394 using molecular rapid test. There were 246,847 people under monitoring (ODP) and 29,690 patients under supervision (PDP).
 Indonesia confirmed 533 new cases, bringing the total number to 13,645. 113 patients recovered while 16 patients deceased. 370 municipalities and regencies had reported at least one positive case.
 10 May
 158,273 specimens from 113,452 people had been tested, 157,769 of which using real time PCR and 504 using molecular rapid test. There were 248,690 people under monitoring (ODP) and 30,317 patients under supervision (PDP).
 Indonesia confirmed 387 new cases, bringing the total number to 14,032. 91 patients recovered while 14 patients deceased. 373 municipalities and regencies had reported at least one positive case.
 11 May
 161,351 specimens from 116,358 people had been tested. There were 249,105 people under monitoring (ODP) and 31,994 patients under supervision (PDP).
 Indonesia confirmed 233 new cases, bringing the total number to 14,265. 183 patients recovered while 18 patients deceased. 373 municipalities and regencies had reported at least one positive case.
 12 May
 165,128 specimens from 119,728 people had been tested. There were 251,861 people under monitoring (ODP) and 32,147 patients under supervision (PDP).
 Indonesia confirmed 484 new cases, bringing the total number to 14,749. 182 patients recovered while 16 patients deceased. 376 municipalities and regencies had reported at least one positive case.
 13 May
 169,195 specimens from 123,572 people had been tested. There were 256,299 people under monitoring (ODP) and 33,042 patients under supervision (PDP).
 Indonesia confirmed 689 new cases, bringing the total number to 15,438. 224 patients recovered while 21 patients deceased. 379 municipalities and regencies had reported at least one positive case.
 14 May
 173,690 specimens from 127,813 people had been tested. There were 258,639 people under monitoring (ODP) and 33,672 patients under supervision (PDP).
 Indonesia confirmed 568 new cases, bringing the total number to 16,006. 231 patients recovered while 15 patients deceased. 382 municipalities and regencies had reported at least one positive case.
 15 May
 178,602 specimens from 132,060 people had been tested. There were 262,919 people under monitoring (ODP) and 34,360 patients under supervision (PDP).
 Indonesia confirmed 490 new cases, bringing the total number to 16,496. 285 patients recovered, the highest single-day recovery, while 33 patients deceased. 383 municipalities and regencies had reported at least one positive case.
 16 May
 182,818 specimens from 135,726 people had been tested. There were 269,449 people under monitoring (ODP) and 35,069 patients under supervision (PDP).
 Indonesia confirmed 529 new cases, bringing the total number to 17,025. 108 patients recovered, while 13 patients deceased. 386 municipalities and regencies had reported at least one positive case.
 17 May
 187,965 specimens from 140,473 people had been tested. There were 270,876 people under monitoring (ODP) and 35,800 patients under supervision (PDP).
 Indonesia confirmed 489 new cases, bringing the total number to 17,514. 218 patients recovered, while 59 patients deceased. 387 municipalities and regencies had reported at least one positive case.
 18 May
 190,660 specimens from 143,035 people had been tested. There were 45,047 people under monitoring (ODP) and 11,422 patients under supervision (PDP).
 Indonesia confirmed 496 new cases, bringing the total number to 18,010. 195 patients recovered, while 43 patients deceased. 389 municipalities and regencies had reported at least one positive case.
 19 May
 202,936 specimens from 147,799 people had been tested; a record-breaking 12,276 tests were conducted in a single day. There were 45,300 people under monitoring (ODP) and 11,891 patients under supervision (PDP).
 Indonesia confirmed 486 new cases, bringing the total number to 18,596. 143 patients recovered, while 30 patients deceased. 390 municipalities and regencies had reported at least one positive case.
 20 May
 211,883 specimens had been tested. There were 44,703 people under monitoring (ODP) and 11,705 patients under supervision (PDP).
 Indonesia confirmed 693 new cases, bringing the total number to 19,189. 108 patients recovered, making the total recovery of 4,575. 21 patients deceased, bringing the tally to 1,242. 391 municipalities and regencies had reported at least one positive case.
 21 May
 219,975 specimens had been tested. There were 50,187 people under monitoring (ODP) and 11,066 patients under supervision (PDP).
 Indonesia confirmed 973 new cases, the most new cases in a single day to date, bringing the total number to 20,162. 263 patients recovered, making the total recovery of 4,838. 36 patients deceased, bringing the tally to 1,278. 392 municipalities and regencies had reported at least one positive case.
 502 new cases were confirmed in East Java alone, the most new cases recorded in a single day in one province.
 22 May
 229,334 specimens had been tested. There were 47,150 people under monitoring (ODP) and 11,028 patients under supervision (PDP).
 Indonesia confirmed 634 new cases, bringing the total number to 20,796. 219 patients recovered, making the total recovery of 5,027. 48 patients deceased, bringing the tally to 1,326. 395 municipalities and regencies had reported at least one positive case.
 Jakarta became the first province to hit 500 deaths.
 23 May
 239,740 specimens had been tested. There were 49,958 people under monitoring (ODP) and 11,495 patients under supervision (PDP).
 Indonesia confirmed 949 new cases, bringing the total number to 21,745. 192 patients recovered, making the total recovery of 5,249. 25 patients deceased, bringing the tally to 1,351. 399 municipalities and regencies had reported at least one positive case.
 24 May
 248,455 specimens had been tested. There were 42,551 people under monitoring (ODP) and 11,389 patients under supervision (PDP).
 Indonesia confirmed 526 new cases, bringing the total number to 22,271. 153 patients recovered, making the total recovery of 5,402. 21 patients deceased, bringing the tally to 1,372. 404 municipalities and regencies had reported at least one positive case.
 President Joko Widodo announced his decision to reopen areas affected by the large-scale social restrictions, dubbed as the "new normal".
 25 May
 256,946 specimens had been tested. There were 49,361 people under monitoring (ODP) and 12,342 patients under supervision (PDP).
 Indonesia confirmed 479 new cases, bringing the total number to 22,750. 240 patients recovered, making the total recovery of 5,642. 19 patients deceased, bringing the tally to 1,391. 405 municipalities and regencies had reported at least one positive case.
 26 May
 264,098 specimens had been tested. There were 65,748 people under monitoring (ODP) and 12,022 patients under supervision (PDP).
 Indonesia confirmed 415 new cases, bringing the total number to 23,165. 235 patients recovered, making the total recovery of 5,877. 27 patients deceased, bringing the tally to 1,418. 406 municipalities and regencies had reported at least one positive case.
 27 May
 278,411 specimens had been tested; a record-breaking 14,313 tests were conducted in a single day. There were 49,942 people under monitoring (ODP) and 12,667 patients under supervision (PDP).
 Indonesia confirmed 686 new cases, bringing the total number to 23,851. 180 patients recovered, making the total recovery of 6,057. 55 patients deceased, bringing the tally to 1,473. 410 municipalities and regencies had reported at least one positive case.
 Head of the COVID-19 Response Acceleration Task Force Doni Monardo announced that the large increase of number of cases in Jakarta was mostly contributed by repatriated migrant workers under quarantine. The number of hospitalizations in Jakarta have also passed its peak from 54.3% on 17 May to 46.9% on this day.
 28 May
 289,906 specimens had been tested. There were 48,749 people under monitoring (ODP) and 13,250 patients under supervision (PDP).
 Indonesia confirmed 687 new cases, bringing the total number to 24,538. 183 patients recovered, making the total recovery of 6,240. 23 patients deceased, bringing the tally to 1,496. 412 municipalities and regencies had reported at least one positive case.
 29 May
 300,545 specimens had been tested. There were 49,212 people under monitoring (ODP) and 12,499 patients under supervision (PDP).
 Indonesia confirmed 678 new cases, bringing the total number to 25,216. 252 patients recovered, making the total recovery of 6,492. 24 patients deceased, bringing the tally to 1,520. 414 municipalities and regencies had reported at least one positive case.
 30 May
 311,906 specimens had been tested. There were 47,714 people under monitoring (ODP) and 12,832 patients under supervision (PDP).
 Indonesia confirmed 557 new cases, bringing the total number to 25,773. 523 patients recovered, the most recovery in a single day to date, making the total number of 7,015. 53 patients deceased, bringing the tally to 1,573. 414 municipalities and regencies had reported at least one positive case.
 31 May
 323,376 specimens had been tested from 216,769 people. There were 49,936 people under monitoring (ODP) and 12,913 patients under supervision (PDP).
 Indonesia confirmed 700 new cases, bringing the total number to 26,473. 293 patients recovered, making the total recovery of 7,308. 40 patients deceased, bringing the tally to 1,613. 416 municipalities and regencies had reported at least one positive case.

June 
 1 June
 333,415 specimens had been tested from 223,624 people. There were 48,358 people under monitoring (ODP) and 13,120 patients under supervision (PDP).
 Indonesia confirmed 467 new cases, bringing the total number to 26,940. 329 patients recovered, making the total recovery of 7,637. 28 patients deceased, bringing the tally to 1,641. 416 municipalities and regencies had reported at least one positive case.
 2 June
 342,464 specimens had been tested from 232,113 people. There were 48,023 people under monitoring (ODP) and 13,213 patients under supervision (PDP).
 Indonesia confirmed 609 new cases, bringing the total number to 27,549. 298 patients recovered, making the total recovery of 7,935. 22 patients deceased, bringing the tally to 1,663. 417 municipalities and regencies had reported at least one positive case.
 3 June
 354,434 specimens had been tested from 237,947 people. There were 48,153 people under monitoring (ODP) and 13,285 patients under supervision (PDP).
 Indonesia confirmed 684 new cases, bringing the total number to 28,233. 471 patients recovered, making the total recovery of 8,406. 35 patients deceased, bringing the tally to 1,698. 418 municipalities and regencies had reported at least one positive case.
 4 June
 367,640 specimens had been tested from 246,433 people. There were 47,373 people under monitoring (ODP) and 13,416 patients under supervision (PDP).
 Indonesia confirmed 585 new cases, bringing the total number to 28,818. 486 patients recovered, making the total recovery of 8,892. 23 patients deceased, bringing the tally to 1,721. 418 municipalities and regencies had reported at least one positive case.
 Jakarta announced extension of social restrictions but also imposed relaxations, including reopening of religious houses and shopping malls in stages, and possible community-based isolation.
 5 June
 380,973 specimens had been tested from 251,736 people. There were 49,320 people under monitoring (ODP) and 13,592 patients under supervision (PDP).
 Indonesia confirmed 703 new cases, bringing the total number to 29,521. 551 patients recovered, the most recovery in a single day to date, making the total number of 9,443. 49 patients deceased, bringing the tally to 1,770. 420 municipalities and regencies had reported at least one positive case.
 6 June
 394,068 specimens had been tested from 256,810 people. There were 46,571 people under monitoring (ODP) and 13,347 patients under supervision (PDP).
 Indonesia confirmed 993 new cases, the most new cases in a single day to date, bringing the total number to 30,514. 464 patients recovered, making the total recovery of 9,907. 31 patients deceased, bringing the tally to 1,801. 421 municipalities and regencies had reported at least one positive case.
 7 June
 405,992 specimens had been tested from 264,740 people. There were 40,370 people under monitoring (ODP) and 14,197 patients under supervision (PDP).
 Indonesia confirmed 672 new cases, bringing the total number to 31,186. 591 patients recovered, the most recovery in a single day to date, making the total number of 10,498. 50 patients deceased, bringing the tally to 1,851. 422 municipalities and regencies had reported at least one positive case.
 8 June
 412,980 specimens had been tested from 269,146 people. There were 38,791 people under monitoring (ODP) and 14,010 patients under supervision (PDP).
 Indonesia confirmed 847 new cases, bringing the total number to 32,033. 406 patients recovered, bringing the total number to 10,904. 32 patients deceased, bringing the tally to 1,883. 422 municipalities and regencies had reported at least one positive case.
 3 traditional markets in Bandung were closed after 4 of their vendors were diagnosed with COVID-19.
 9 June
 429,161 specimens had been tested from 274,430 people; a record-breaking 16,181 tests were conducted in the previous 24 hours. There were 38,394 people under monitoring (ODP) and 14,108 patients under supervision (PDP).
 Indonesia confirmed 1,042 new cases, the most new cases in a single day to date, bringing the total number to 33,075. 510 patients recovered, bringing the total number to 11,414. 40 patients deceased, bringing the tally to 1,923. 422 municipalities and regencies had reported at least one positive case.
 Jakarta confirmed 239 new cases, its most new cases in a single day since 16 April.
 10 June
 446,918 specimens had been tested from 281,653 people; a record-breaking 17,757 tests were conducted in the previous 24 hours. There were 43,945 people under monitoring (ODP) and 14,242 patients under supervision (PDP).
 Indonesia confirmed 1,241 new cases, the most new cases in a single day to date, bringing the total number to 34,316. A record-breaking 715 patients recovered, bringing the total number to 12,129. 36 patients deceased, bringing the tally to 1,959. 424 municipalities and regencies had reported at least one positive case.
 East Java overtook Jakarta as the province with the most COVID-19 active cases; 4,595 cases against Jakarta's 4,451.
 The government of Denpasar closed the Kumbasari Traditional Market after 18 of its vendors were diagnosed with COVID-19.
 11 June
 463,620 specimens had been tested from 294,671 people. There were 43,414 people under monitoring (ODP) and 14,052 patients under supervision (PDP).
 Indonesia confirmed 979 new cases, bringing the total number to 35,295. 507 patients recovered, bringing the total number to 12,636. 41 patients deceased, bringing the tally to 2,000. 424 municipalities and regencies had reported at least one positive case.
 East Java overtook Jakarta as the province with the most COVID-19 deaths; 553 deaths against Jakarta's 537.
 Rawasari Traditional Market in Jakarta was temporarily closed after 14 of its vendors were diagnosed with COVID-19.
 12 June
 478,953 specimens had been tested from 302,147 people. There were 37,538 people under monitoring (ODP) and 13,923 patients under supervision (PDP).
 Indonesia confirmed 1,111 new cases, bringing the total number to 36,406. 577 patients recovered, bringing the total number to 13,213. 48 patients deceased, bringing the tally to 2,048. 424 municipalities and regencies had reported at least one positive case.
 Cases outside the top five provinces affected (Jakarta, East Java, West Java, South Sulawesi, and Central Java) hit 579, the most ever.
 13 June
 495,527 specimens had been tested from 313,275 people. There were 42,450 people under monitoring (ODP) and 13,578 patients under supervision (PDP).
 Indonesia confirmed 1,014 new cases, bringing the total number to 37,420. 563 patients recovered, bringing the total number to 13,776. 43 patients deceased, bringing the tally to 2,091. 427 municipalities and regencies had reported at least one positive case.
 14 June
 514,287 specimens had been tested from 322,933 people; a record-breaking 18,760 tests were conducted in the previous 24 hours. There were 41,639 people under monitoring (ODP) and 13,574 patients under supervision (PDP).
 Indonesia confirmed 857 new cases, bringing the total number to 38,277. A record-breaking 755 patients recovered, bringing the total number to 14,531. 43 patients deceased, bringing the tally to 2,134. 430 municipalities and regencies had reported at least one positive case.
 15 June
 523,063 specimens had been tested from 329,190 people. There were 36,744 people under monitoring (ODP) and 13,649 patients under supervision (PDP).
 Indonesia confirmed 1,017 new cases, bringing the total number to 39,294. 592 patients recovered, bringing the total number to 15,123. A record-breaking 64 patients deceased, bringing the tally to 2,198. 431 municipalities and regencies had reported at least one positive case.
 16 June
 540,115 specimens had been tested from 339,309 people. There were 29,124 people under monitoring (ODP) and 13,510 patients under supervision (PDP).
 Indonesia confirmed 1,106 new cases, bringing the total number to 40,400. 580 patients recovered, bringing the total number to 15,703. 33 patients deceased, bringing the tally to 2,231. 431 municipalities and regencies had reported at least one positive case.
 17 June
 559,872 specimens had been tested from 348,278 people; a record-breaking 19,757 tests were conducted in the previous 24 hours. There were 42,714 people under monitoring (ODP) and 13,279 patients under supervision (PDP).
 Indonesia confirmed 1,031 new cases, bringing the total number to 41,431. As a result, it overtook Singapore as the most affected country in Southeast Asia. 540 patients recovered, bringing the total number to 16,243. 45 patients deceased, bringing the tally to 2,276. 432 municipalities and regencies had reported at least one positive case.
 18 June
 580,522 specimens had been tested from 358,659 people; a record-breaking 20,650 tests were conducted in the previous 24 hours. There were 36,698 people under monitoring (ODP) and 17,923 patients under supervision (PDP).
 Indonesia confirmed a record-breaking 1,331 new cases, bringing the total number to 42,762. 555 patients recovered, bringing the total number to 16,798. 63 patients deceased, bringing the tally to 2,339. 435 municipalities and regencies had reported at least one positive case.
 19 June
 601,239 specimens had been tested from 366,581 people; a record-breaking 20,717 tests were conducted in the previous 24 hours. There were 36,464 people under monitoring (ODP) and 13,211 patients under supervision (PDP).
 Indonesia confirmed 1,041 new cases, bringing the total number to 43,803. 551 patients recovered, bringing the total number to 17,349. 34 patients deceased, bringing the tally to 2,373. 435 municipalities and regencies had reported at least one positive case.
 20 June
 621,156 specimens had been tested from 376,518 people. There were 37,336 people under monitoring (ODP) and 13,150 patients under supervision (PDP).
 Indonesia confirmed 1,226 new cases, bringing the total number to 45,029. 534 patients recovered, bringing the total number to 17,883. 56 patients deceased, bringing the tally to 2,429. 438 municipalities and regencies had reported at least one positive case.
 21 June
 639,385 specimens had been tested from 383,105 people. There were 56,436 people under monitoring (ODP) and 13,225 patients under supervision (PDP).
 Indonesia confirmed 862 new cases, bringing the total number to 45,891. 521 patients recovered, bringing the total number to 18,404. 36 patients deceased, bringing the tally to 2,465. 439 municipalities and regencies had reported at least one positive case.
 22 June
 650,311 specimens had been tested from 393,117 people. There were 43,500 people under monitoring (ODP) and 12,999 patients under supervision (PDP).
 Indonesia confirmed 954 new cases, bringing the total number to 46,845. 331 patients recovered, bringing the total number to 18,735. 35 patients deceased, bringing the tally to 2,500. 440 municipalities and regencies had reported at least one positive case.
 Jakarta became the first province to confirm 10,000 cases, 114 days after its first cases.
 23 June
 668,219 specimens had been tested from 401,681 people. There were 35,983 people under monitoring (ODP) and 13,348 patients under supervision (PDP).
 Indonesia confirmed 1,051 new cases, bringing the total number to 47,896. 506 patients recovered, bringing the total number to 19,241. 35 patients deceased, bringing the tally to 2,535. 442 municipalities and regencies had reported at least one positive case.
 East Java's cases exceeded 10,000 in 100 days after its first confirmed cases, becoming the second and the fastest province to have more than 10,000 cases.
 24 June
 689,492 specimens had been tested from 413,919 people; a record-breaking 21,233 tests were conducted in the previous 24 hours. There were 36,648 people under monitoring (ODP) and 13,069 patients under supervision (PDP).
 Indonesia confirmed 1,113 new cases, bringing the total number to 49,009. 417 patients recovered, bringing the total number to 19,658. 38 patients deceased, bringing the tally to 2,573. 443 municipalities and regencies had reported at least one positive case.
 25 June
 708,962 specimens had been tested from 427,158 people. There were 37,294 people under monitoring (ODP) and 13,323 patients under supervision (PDP).
 Indonesia confirmed 1,178 new cases, bringing the total number to 50,187. A record-breaking 791 patients recovered, bringing the total number to 20,449. 47 patients deceased, bringing the tally to 2,620. 446 municipalities and regencies had reported at least one positive case.
 Jakarta became the first province to pass 1,000 cases/million.
 26 June
 731,781 specimens had been tested from 439,907 people; a record-breaking 22,819 tests were conducted in the previous 24 hours. There were 38,381 people under monitoring (ODP) and 13,506 patients under supervision (PDP).
 Indonesia confirmed 1,240 new cases, bringing the total number to 51,427. A record-breaking 884 patients recovered, bringing the total number to 21,333. 63 patients deceased, bringing the tally to 2,683. 448 municipalities and regencies had reported at least one positive case.
 East Java took over Jakarta as the province with the most COVID-19 confirmed cases 117 days into the crisis; East Java had 10,901 cases against Jakarta's 10,796.
 27 June
 753,370 specimens had been tested from 449,569 people. There were 40,541 people under monitoring (ODP) and 13,522 patients under supervision (PDP).
 Indonesia confirmed a record-breaking 1,385 new cases, bringing the total number to 52,812. 576 patients recovered, bringing the total number to 21,909. 37 patients deceased, bringing the tally to 2,720. 448 municipalities and regencies had reported at least one positive case.
 28 June
 770,600 specimens had been tested from 456,636 people. There were 47,658 people under monitoring (ODP) and 14,712 patients under supervision (PDP).
 Indonesia confirmed 1,198 new cases, bringing the total number to 54,010. A record-breaking 1,027 patients recovered, bringing the total number to 22,936. 34 patients deceased, bringing the tally to 2,754. 448 municipalities and regencies had reported at least one positive case.
 29 June
 782,383 specimens had been tested from 465,683 people. There were 41,605 people under monitoring (ODP) and 13,335 patients under supervision (PDP).
 Indonesia confirmed 1,082 new cases, bringing the total number to 55,092. 864 patients recovered, bringing the total number to 23,800. 51 patients deceased, bringing the tally to 2,805. 448 municipalities and regencies had reported at least one positive case.
 30 June
 803,898 specimens had been tested from 477,318 people. There were 43,797 people under monitoring (ODP) and 13,182 patients under supervision (PDP).
 Indonesia confirmed 1,293 new cases, bringing the total number to 56,385. 1,006 patients recovered, bringing the total number to 24,806. A record-breaking 71 patients deceased, bringing the tally to 2,876. 449 municipalities and regencies had reported at least one positive case.

July 
 1 July
 825,636 specimens had been tested from 492,318 people. There were 45,192 people under monitoring (ODP) and 13,296 patients under supervision (PDP).
 Indonesia confirmed a joint-record of 1,385 new cases, bringing the total number to 57,770. 789 patients recovered, bringing the total number to 25,595. 58 patients deceased, bringing the tally to 2,934. 451 municipalities and regencies had reported at least one positive case.
 2 July
 849,155 specimens had been tested from 503,132 people; a record-breaking 23,519 tests were conducted in the previous 24 hours. There were 40,778 people under monitoring (ODP) and 13,359 patients under supervision (PDP).
 Indonesia confirmed a record-breaking 1,624 new cases, bringing the total number to 59,394. 1,072 patients recovered, also a record-breaker, bringing the total number to 26,667. 53 patients deceased, bringing the tally to 2,987. 452 municipalities and regencies had reported at least one positive case.
 3 July
 871,436 specimens had been tested from 519,970 people. There were 38,767 people under monitoring (ODP) and 13,609 patients under supervision (PDP).
 Indonesia confirmed 1,301 new cases, bringing the total number to 60,695. 901 patients recovered, bringing the total number to 27,568. 49 patients deceased, bringing the tally to 3,036. 453 municipalities and regencies had reported at least one positive case.
 4 July
 894,428 specimens had been tested from 529,669 people. There were 38,890 people under monitoring (ODP) and 14,205 patients under supervision (PDP).
 Indonesia confirmed 1,447 new cases, bringing the total number to 62,142. 651 patients recovered, bringing the total number to 28,219. 53 patients deceased, bringing the tally to 3,089. 453 municipalities and regencies had reported at least one positive case.
 5 July
 915,482 specimens had been tested from 540,175 people. There were 39,928 people under monitoring (ODP) and 13,767 patients under supervision (PDP).
 Indonesia confirmed 1,607 new cases, bringing the total number to 63,749. 886 patients recovered, bringing the total number to 29,105. A record of 82 patients deceased, bringing the tally to 3,171. 453 municipalities and regencies had reported at least one positive case.
 East Java broke its own record for most single-day new cases by a province with 552 as well as becoming the first province to pass 1,000 COVID-19 deaths.
 Hundreds of COVID-19 cases from Semarang, Central Java were identified coming from three factories.
 6 July
 928,238 specimens had been tested from 552,084 people. There were 38,748 people under monitoring (ODP) and 13,360 patients under supervision (PDP).
 Indonesia confirmed 1,209 new cases, bringing the total number to 64,958. 814 patients recovered, bringing the total number to 29,919. 70 patients deceased, bringing the tally to 3,241. 455 municipalities and regencies had reported at least one positive case.
 Jambi reported its first COVID-19 death 127 days into the crisis, becoming the last province to do so.
 7 July
 946,054 specimens had been tested from 562,759 people. There were 38,702 people under monitoring (ODP) and 13,471 patients under supervision (PDP).
 Indonesia confirmed 1,268 new cases, bringing the total number to 66,226. 866 patients recovered, bringing the total number to 30,785. 68 patients deceased, bringing the tally to 3,309. 456 municipalities and regencies had reported at least one positive case.
 8 July
 968,237 specimens had been tested from 581,594 people. There were 38,498 people under monitoring (ODP) and 13,636 patients under supervision (PDP).
 Indonesia confirmed a record-breaking 1,853 new cases, bringing the total number to 68,079. 800 patients recovered, bringing the total number to 31,585. 50 patients deceased, bringing the tally to 3,359. 456 municipalities and regencies had reported at least one positive case.
 9 July
 992,069 specimens had been tested from 588,080 people; a record-breaking 23,832 tests were conducted in the previous 24 hours. There were 38,498 people under monitoring (ODP) and 13,732 patients under supervision (PDP).
 Indonesia confirmed a record-breaking 2,657 new cases, bringing the total number to 70,736. 1,066 patients recovered, bringing the total number to 32,651. 58 patients deceased, bringing the tally to 3,417. 457 municipalities and regencies had reported at least one positive case.
 West Java broke the record for most single-day new cases by a province with 962, most of which came from the so-far confirmed 1,262 cases from the Indonesian Army’s Officer Candidate School in Bandung. Only 17 of these cases were symptomatic and isolated in hospitals.
 10 July
 1,015,678 specimens had been tested from 597,468 people. There were 38,705 people under monitoring (ODP) and 13,882 patients under supervision (PDP).
 Indonesia confirmed 1,611 new cases, bringing the total number to 72,347. 878 patients recovered, bringing the total number to 33,529. 52 patients deceased, bringing the tally to 3,469. 459 municipalities and regencies had reported at least one positive case.
 Another COVID-19 cluster was identified in West Java after 99 soldiers at the Indonesian Army's Military Police Education Center in Cimahi were diagnosed.
 11 July
 1,038,988 specimens had been tested from 610,093 people. There were 34,887 people under monitoring (ODP) and 13,752 patients under supervision (PDP).
 Indonesia confirmed 1,671 new cases, bringing the total number to 74,018. A record-breaking 1,190 patients recovered, bringing the total number to 34,719. 66 patients deceased, bringing the tally to 3,535. 460 municipalities and regencies had reported at least one positive case.
 12 July
 1,061,367 specimens had been tested from 621,087 people. There were 34,486 people under monitoring (ODP) and 14,515 patients under supervision (PDP).
 Indonesia confirmed 1,681 new cases, bringing the total number to 75,699. 919 patients recovered, bringing the total number to 35,638. 71 patients deceased, bringing the tally to 3,606. 460 municipalities and regencies had reported at least one positive case.
 13 July
 1,074,467 specimens had been tested from 630,149 people. There were 33,504 people under monitoring (ODP) and 13,439 patients under supervision (PDP).
 Indonesia confirmed 1,282 new cases, bringing the total number to 76,981. 1,051 patients recovered, bringing the total number to 36,689. 50 patients deceased, bringing the tally to 3,656. 461 municipalities and regencies had reported at least one positive case.
 For the first time ever since the pandemic, the number of recovered cases exceeded the number of active cases.
 South Kalimantan became the second province to pass 1,000 cases per million.
 60 employees of the state-owned radio station RRI in Surabaya were diagnosed with COVID-19, forcing the closure of the office for 14 days. In addition, after 2 employees of the state-owned TV station TVRI in Surabaya succumbed to COVID-19; its office was also forced to close for 15 days.
 The provincial government of West Java announced a total of 1,950 deaths buried according to COVID-19 procedures, consisting of 138 people under monitoring (ODP), 1,631 patients under supervision (PDP), 180 confirmed cases, and one asymptomatic confirmed case (OTG).
 14 July
 1,097,468 specimens had been tested from 642,164 people. There were 46,943 suspected cases.
 Indonesia confirmed 1,591 new cases, bringing the total number to 78,572. 947 patients recovered, bringing the total number to 37,636. 54 patients deceased, bringing the tally to 3,710. 461 municipalities and regencies had reported at least one positive case.
 The central government reclassified COVID-19 cases into suspects, probables, confirmed, and discarded. Deaths would be recalculated as a combination of both confirmed and probable cases, while suspects would be recalculated as a combination of both people under monitoring (ODP) and patients under supervision (PDP).
 15 July
 1,122,339 specimens had been tested from 657,655 people; a record-breaking 24,871 tests were conducted in the previous 24 hours. There were 47,859 suspected cases.
 Indonesia confirmed 1,522 new cases, bringing the total number to 80,094. A record-breaking 1,414 patients recovered, bringing the total number to 39,050. 87 patients deceased, also a record-breaker, bringing the tally to 3,797. 463 municipalities and regencies had reported at least one positive case.
 16 July
 1,146,286 specimens had been tested from 669,811 people. There were 46,727 suspected cases.
 Indonesia confirmed 1,574 new cases, bringing the total number to 81,668. 1,295 patients recovered, bringing the total number to 40,345. 76 patients deceased, bringing the tally to 3,873. 464 municipalities and regencies had reported at least one positive case.
 17 July
 1,175,462 specimens had been tested from 683,805 people; a record-breaking 29,176 tests were conducted in the previous 24 hours. There were 46,493 suspected cases.
 Indonesia confirmed 1,462 new cases, bringing the total number to 83,130. A record-breaking 1,489 patients recovered, bringing the total number to 41,834. 84 patients deceased, bringing the tally to 3,957. 464 municipalities and regencies had reported at least one positive case.
 18 July
 1,201,014 specimens had been tested from 697,043 people. There were 37,593 suspected cases.
 Indonesia confirmed 1,752 new cases, bringing the total number to 84,882. 1,434 patients recovered, bringing the total number to 43,268. 59 patients deceased, bringing the tally to 4,016. 464 municipalities and regencies had reported at least one positive case.
 Jakarta became the first province to pass 10,000 recoveries.
 North Maluku became the third province to pass 1,000 cases per million.
 19 July
 1,221,518 specimens had been tested from 707,238 people. There were 37,505 suspected cases.
 Indonesia confirmed 1,639 new cases, bringing the total number to 86,521. A record-breaking 2,133 patients recovered, bringing the total number to 45,401. 127 patients deceased, also a record-breaker, bringing the tally to 4,143. 464 municipalities and regencies had reported at least one positive case.
 As of 19 July, 100 regencies and municipalities had no active cases, while 35 were in a high risk of COVID-19 local transmission.
 20 July
 1,235,545 specimens had been tested from 720,497 people. There were 36,380 suspected cases.
 Indonesia confirmed 1,693 new cases, bringing the total number to 88,214. 1,576 patients recovered, bringing the total number to 46,977. 96 patients deceased, bringing the tally to 4,239. 467 municipalities and regencies had reported at least one positive case.
 The archbishop of the Roman Catholic Archdiocese of Medan and 4 other priests were positively diagnosed with COVID-19.
As a result, this was also the last day of the daily data update broadcast.
 21 July
 1,257,807 specimens had been tested from 737,844 people. There were 44,003 suspected cases.
 Indonesia confirmed 1,655 new cases, bringing the total number to 89,869. 1,489 patients recovered, bringing the total number to 48,466. 81 patients deceased, bringing the tally to 4,320. 469 municipalities and regencies had reported at least one positive case.
 22 July
 1,283,109 specimens had been tested from 749,626 people. There were 44,222 suspected cases.
 Indonesia confirmed 1,882 new cases, bringing the total number to 91,751. 1,795 patients recovered, bringing the total number to 50,255. A record of 139 patients deceased, bringing the tally to 4,459. 469 municipalities and regencies had reported at least one positive case.
 West Kalimantan became the first ever province to have no active cases since the reported index case on 10 March. In total, 359 cases had been recorded, with 355 recoveries and four deaths.
 Central Java reported 70 deaths in the last 24 hours, making it the highest number of deaths per province in a day.
 23 July
 1,310,924 specimens had been tested from 762,957 people. There were 47,756 suspected cases.
 Indonesia confirmed 1,906 new cases, bringing the total number to 93,657. 1,909 patients recovered, bringing the total number to 52,164. 117 patients deceased, bringing the tally to 4,576. 469 municipalities and regencies had reported at least one positive case.
 24 July
 1,335,889 specimens had been tested from 777,100 people. There were 53,702 suspected cases.
 Indonesia confirmed 1,761 new cases, bringing the total number to 95,418. 1,781 patients recovered, bringing the total number to 53,945. 89 patients deceased, bringing the tally to 4,665. 470 municipalities and regencies had reported at least one positive case.
 25 July
 1,361,207 specimens had been tested from 789,258 people. There were 54,752 suspected cases.
 Indonesia confirmed 1,868 new cases, bringing the total number to 97,286. 1,409 patients recovered, bringing the total number to 55,354. 49 patients deceased, bringing the tally to 4,714. 471 municipalities and regencies had reported at least one positive case.
 East Java overtook Jakarta as the province with most recoveries. East Java had 11,955 recoveries while Jakarta had 11,725. As the result, the province was having the most confirmed cases, most recoveries, most deaths, and most active cases.
 26 July
 1,381,699 specimens had been tested from 796,950 people. There were 55,647 suspected cases.
 Indonesia confirmed 1,492 new cases, bringing the total number to 98,778. 1,301 patients recovered, bringing the total number to 56,655. 67 patients deceased, bringing the tally to 4,781. 471 municipalities and regencies had reported at least one positive case.
 27 July
 1,394,759 specimens had been tested from 807,946 people. There were 54,910 suspected cases.
 Indonesia confirmed 1,525 new cases, bringing the total number to 100,303. 1,518 patients recovered, bringing the total number to 58,173. 57 patients deceased, bringing the tally to 4,838. 471 municipalities and regencies had reported at least one positive case.
 Jakarta overtook East Java as the province with most active cases with 6,826 to the latter's 6,524, 47 days after East Java did the opposite.
 28 July
 1,417,322 specimens had been tested from 823,168 people. There were 46,648 suspected cases.
 Indonesia confirmed 1,748 new cases, bringing the total number to 102,051. 2,366 patients recovered, an all-time high, bringing the total number to 60,539. 63 patients deceased, bringing the tally to 4,901. 471 municipalities and regencies had reported at least one positive case.
 The National Board of Disaster Management had identified 613 COVID-19 clusters in Jakarta: 243 of which were at homes, 173 at traditional markets, 124 at health facilities, and 90 at offices.
 29 July
 1,447,583 specimens had been tested from 841,027 people; a record-breaking 30,261 tests were conducted in the previous 24 hours. There were 57,393 suspected cases.
 Indonesia confirmed 2,381 new cases, bringing the total number to 104,432. 1,599 patients recovered, bringing the total number to 62,138. 74 patients deceased, bringing the tally to 4,975. 473 municipalities and regencies had reported at least one positive case.
 30 July
 1,477,629 specimens had been tested from 856,003 people. There were 53,723 suspected cases.
 Indonesia confirmed 1,904 new cases, bringing the total number to 106,336. 2,154 patients recovered, bringing the total number to 64,292. 83 patients deceased, bringing the tally to 5,058. 476 municipalities and regencies had reported at least one positive case.
 31 July
 1,506,191 specimens had been tested from 866,539 people. There were 60,739 suspected cases.
 Indonesia confirmed 2,040 new cases, bringing the total number to 108,376. 1,615 patients recovered, bringing the total number to 65,907. 73 patients deceased, bringing the tally to 5,131. 476 municipalities and regencies had reported at least one positive case.

August 
 1 August
 1,517,381 specimens had been tested from 875,894 people. There were 57,816 suspected cases.
 Indonesia confirmed 1,560 new cases, bringing the total number to 109,936. 2,012 patients recovered, bringing the total number to 67,919. 62 patients deceased, bringing the tally to 5,193. 476 municipalities and regencies had reported at least one positive case.
 2 August
 1,537,413 specimens had been tested from 882,352 people. There were 62,366 suspected cases.
 Indonesia confirmed 1,519 new cases, bringing the total number to 111,455. 1,056 patients recovered, bringing the total number to 68,975. 43 patients deceased, bringing the tally to 5,236. 478 municipalities and regencies had reported at least one positive case.
 3 August
 1,552,141 specimens had been tested from 894,531 people. There were 77,572 suspected cases.
 Indonesia confirmed 1,679 new cases, bringing the total number to 113,134. 1,262 patients recovered, bringing the total number to 70,237. 66 patients deceased, bringing the tally to 5,302. 479 municipalities and regencies had reported at least one positive case.
 4 August
 1,575,043 specimens had been tested from 907,987 people. There were 68,131 suspected cases.
 Indonesia confirmed 1,922 new cases, bringing the total number to 115,056. 1,813 patients recovered, bringing the total number to 72,050. 86 patients deceased, bringing the tally to 5,388. 479 municipalities and regencies had reported at least one positive case.
 5 August
 1,603,781 specimens had been tested from 922,888 people. There were 94,593 suspected cases.
 Indonesia confirmed 1,815 new cases, bringing the total number to 116,871. 1,839 patients recovered, bringing the total number to 73,889. 64 patients deceased, bringing the tally to 5,452. 479 municipalities and regencies had reported at least one positive case.
 President Joko Widodo signed an executive order authorizing local governments to impose fines or social punishment for non-compliance of face mask obligation and business failing to adhere to COVID-19 restrictions, which will also be enforced by the police and military.
 6 August
 1,633,156 specimens had been tested from 936,311 people. There were 91,219 suspected cases.
 Indonesia confirmed 1,882 new cases, bringing the total number to 118,753. 1,756 patients recovered, bringing the total number to 75,645. 69 patients deceased, bringing the tally to 5,521. 479 municipalities and regencies had reported at least one positive case.
 7 August
 1,663,315 specimens had been tested from 951,910 people. There were 80,200 suspected cases.
 Indonesia confirmed 2,473 new cases, bringing the total number to 121,226. 1,912 patients recovered, bringing the total number to 77,557. 72 patients deceased, bringing the tally to 5,593. 479 municipalities and regencies had reported at least one positive case.
 After 41 days, Jakarta retook the status as province with the most cases; 24,601 compared to the previous leading province East Java's 24,493.
 The Indonesian government decided to expand reopening of schools to include regions with low risks of COVID-19 spread in addition to regions without active cases or unaffected by the disease.
 8 August
 1,693,880 specimens had been tested from 963,602 people; a record-breaking 30,565 tests were conducted in the previous 24 hours. There were 83,624 suspected cases.
 Indonesia confirmed 2,277 new cases, bringing the total number to 123,503. 1,749 patients recovered, bringing the total number to 79,306. 65 patients deceased, bringing the tally to 5,658. 480 municipalities and regencies had reported at least one positive case.
 9 August
 1,715,798 specimens had been tested from 972,594 people. There were 86,224 suspected cases.
 Indonesia confirmed 1,893 new cases, bringing the total number to 125,396. 1,646 patients recovered, bringing the total number to 80,952. 65 patients deceased, bringing the tally to 5,723. 480 municipalities and regencies had reported at least one positive case.
 10 August
 1,731,634 specimens had been tested from 984,893 people. There were 84,139 suspected cases.
 Indonesia confirmed 1,687 new cases, bringing the total number to 127,083. 1,284 patients recovered, bringing the total number to 82,236. 42 patients deceased, bringing the tally to 5,765. 480 municipalities and regencies had reported at least one positive case.
 11 August
 1,757,425 specimens had been tested from 998,406 people. There were 85,928 suspected cases.
 Indonesia confirmed 1,693 new cases, bringing the total number to 128,776. 1,474 patients recovered, bringing the total number to 83,710. 59 patients deceased, bringing the tally to 5,824. 481 municipalities and regencies had reported at least one positive case.
 12 August
 1,783,673 specimens had been tested from 1,012,104 people. There were 86,619 suspected cases.
 Indonesia confirmed 1,942 new cases, bringing the total number to 130,718. 2,088 patients recovered, bringing the total number to 85,798. 79 patients deceased, bringing the tally to 5,903. 481 municipalities and regencies had reported at least one positive case.
 13 August
 1,809,487 specimens had been tested from 1,026,954 people. There were 76,515 suspected cases.
 Indonesia confirmed 2,098 new cases, bringing the total number to 132,816. 1,760 patients recovered, bringing the total number to 87,558. 65 patients deceased, bringing the tally to 5,968. 481 municipalities and regencies had reported at least one positive case.
 Several clusters at school were identified in some provinces, such as in East Java, Central Java, West Kalimantan, Banten, Papua, and North Maluku.
 14 August
 1,835,505 specimens had been tested from 1,039,682 people. There were 75,257 suspected cases.
 Indonesia confirmed 2,307 new cases, bringing the total number to 135,123. 2,060 patients recovered, bringing the total number to 89,618. 53 patients deceased, bringing the tally to 6,021. 481 municipalities and regencies had reported at least one positive case.
 Eight doctors in Medan died from COVID-19.
 15 August
 1,862,801 specimens had been tested from 1,052,503 people. There were 76,327 suspected cases.
 Indonesia confirmed 2,345 new cases, bringing the total number to 137,468. 1,703 patients recovered, bringing the total number to 91,321. 50 patients deceased, bringing the tally to 6,071. 482 municipalities and regencies had reported at least one positive case.
 16 August
 1,888,215 specimens had been tested from 1,061,721 people. There were 77,090 suspected cases.
 Indonesia confirmed 2,081 new cases, bringing the total number to 139,549. 1,782 patients recovered, bringing the total number to 93,103. 79 patients deceased, bringing the tally to 6,150. 482 municipalities and regencies had reported at least one positive case.
 17 August
 1,900,668 specimens had been tested from 1,068,945 people. There were 78,659 suspected cases.
 Indonesia confirmed 1,821 new cases, bringing the total number to 141,370. 1,355 patients recovered, bringing the total number to 94,458. 57 patients deceased, bringing the tally to 6,207. 483 municipalities and regencies had reported at least one positive case.
 The annual flag-hoisting and lowering ceremonies at the Merdeka Palace in Jakarta to commemorate the anniversary of the Independence Day were held in limited seats. The flag was not handed by (in the hoisting ceremony) and to (in the lowering ceremony) the president as it usually did, and no tray was used for the flag as well. The number of Paskibraka members was reduced from the usual 68 (one male and one female student from each of the 34 provinces) to only eight and were reselected from the 2019 squad. Only President Joko Widodo, Vice President Ma'ruf Amin, their spouses, and some sitting national government officials – including the Commander of the Armed Forces ACM Hadi Tjahjanto – were present at both ceremonies. The other regular invitees, such as cabinet ministers and living former presidents and vice presidents, were present via videoconference.
 18 August
 1,915,039 specimens had been tested from 1,081,354 people. There were 78,394 suspected cases.
 Indonesia confirmed 1,673 new cases, bringing the total number to 143,043. 1,848 patients recovered, bringing the total number to 96,306. 70 patients deceased, bringing the tally to 6,277. 484 municipalities and regencies had reported at least one positive case.
 19 August
 1,941,117 specimens had been tested from 1,096,294 people. There were 79,174 suspected cases.
 Indonesia confirmed 1,902 new cases, bringing the total number to 144,945. 2,351 patients recovered, bringing the total number to 98,657. 69 patients deceased, bringing the tally to 6,346. 484 municipalities and regencies had reported at least one positive case.
 20 August
 1,969,941 specimens had been tested from 1,108,068 people. There were 79,484 suspected cases.
 Indonesia confirmed 2,266 new cases, bringing the total number to 147,211. 2,017 patients recovered, bringing the total number to 100,674. 72 patients deceased, bringing the tally to 6,418. 485 municipalities and regencies had reported at least one positive case.
 21 August
 1,989,870 specimens had been tested from 1,121,602 people. There were 78,877 suspected cases.
 Indonesia confirmed 2,197 new cases, bringing the total number to 149,408. 2,317 patients recovered, bringing the total number to 102,991. 82 patients deceased, bringing the tally to 6,500. 485 municipalities and regencies had reported at least one positive case.
 137 teachers in Surabaya were confirmed to be COVID-19 positive of which four had died.
 22 August
 2,014,619 specimens had been tested from 1,139,768 people. There were 75,457 suspected cases.
 Indonesia confirmed 2,090 new cases, bringing the total number to 151,498. 2,207 patients recovered, bringing the total number to 105,198. 94 patients deceased, bringing the tally to 6,594. 485 municipalities and regencies had reported at least one positive case.
 23 August
 2,036,771 specimens had been tested from 1,157,184 people. There were 75,522 suspected cases.
 Indonesia confirmed 2,037 new cases, bringing the total number to 153,535. 2,302 patients recovered, bringing the total number to 107,500. 86 patients deceased, bringing the tally to 6,680. 485 municipalities and regencies had reported at least one positive case.
 24 August
 2,056,166 specimens had been tested from 1,173,369 people. There were 76,745 suspected cases.
 Indonesia confirmed 1,877 new cases, bringing the total number to 155,412. A record-breaking 3,560 patients recovered, bringing the total number to 111,060. 79 patients deceased, bringing the tally to 6,759. 485 municipalities and regencies had reported at least one positive case.
 Jakarta confirmed 1,896 recoveries, the most for any province in the span of 24 hours. With this, it retook the title for province with the most recoveries from East Java after 30 days; 25,463 to 23,953.
 25 August
 2,077,441 specimens had been tested from 1,191,948 people. There were 76,667 suspected cases.
 Indonesia confirmed 2,447 new cases, bringing the total number to 157,859. 1,807 patients recovered, bringing the total number to 112,867. 99 patients deceased, bringing the tally to 6,858. 485 municipalities and regencies had reported at least one positive case.
 238 employees of LG Electronics in Cikarang tested positive for COVID-19.
 26 August
 2,106,753 specimens had been tested from 1,212,468 people. There were 77,056 suspected cases.
 Indonesia confirmed 2,306 new cases, bringing the total number to 160,165. 2,542 patients recovered, bringing the total number to 115,409. 86 patients deceased, bringing the tally to 6,944. 485 municipalities and regencies had reported at least one positive case.
 The governor of Bali cancelled his plan to welcome international tourists in September as cases were surging again.
 Governor Anies Baswedan said he would reopen cinemas in Jakarta with tight health protocol despite the high rise in cases there.
 27 August
 2,136,416 specimens had been tested from 1,233,486 people. There were 76,201 suspected cases.
 Indonesia confirmed a record-breaking 2,719 new cases, bringing the total number to 162,884. 3,166 patients recovered, bringing the total number to 118,575. 120 patients deceased, bringing the tally to 7,064. 485 municipalities and regencies had reported at least one positive case.
 28 August
 2,169,498 specimens had been tested from 1,250,135 people; a record-breaking 33,082 tests were conducted in the previous 24 hours. There were 77,857 suspected cases.
 For the second day in a row, Indonesia confirmed a record-breaking number of new cases; 3,003 to be exact, bringing the total number to 165,887. 2,325 patients recovered, bringing the total number to 120,900. 105 patients deceased, bringing the tally to 7,169. 486 municipalities and regencies had reported at least one positive case.
 Indonesian government was preparing a stimulus of discounted holiday trip package amidst of arising cases.
 29 August
 2,198,403 specimens had been tested from 1,271,301 people. There were 76,252 suspected cases.
 For the third day in a row, Indonesia confirmed a record-breaking number of new cases; 3,308 to be exact, bringing the total number to 169,195. 1,902 patients recovered, bringing the total number to 122,802. 92 patients deceased, bringing the tally to 7,261. 487 municipalities and regencies had reported at least one positive case.
 30 August
 2,224,337 specimens had been tested from 1,282,618 people. There were 77,951 suspected cases.
 Indonesia confirmed 2,858 new cases, bringing the total number to 172,053. 1,383 patients recovered, bringing the total number to 124,185. 82 patients deceased, bringing the tally to 7,343. 487 municipalities and regencies had reported at least one positive case.
 Jakarta broke the record for most new cases per province in 24 hours, adding 1,094 to their numbers. It was also the first time that any province added 1,000 or more new cases in such amount of time.
 More infectious COVID-19 mutation was detected in Indonesia. Nearly 40 percent genomes reported in the country were the D614G strain.
 31 August
 2,239,642 specimens had been tested from 1,297,184 people. There were 79,320 suspected cases.
 Indonesia confirmed 2,743 new cases, bringing the total number to 174,796. 1,774 patients recovered, bringing the total number to 125,959. 74 patients deceased, bringing the tally to 7,417. 488 municipalities and regencies had reported at least one positive case.
 At least 100 doctors died from COVID-19. Most of them were in East Java and North Sumatra.
 Hundreds of students at an Islamic boarding school in Banyuwangi were tested positive for the virus.

September 
 1 September
 2,270,267 specimens had been tested from 1,312,477 people. There were 80,675 suspected cases.
 Indonesia confirmed 2,775 new cases, bringing the total number to 177,571. 2,098 patients recovered, bringing the total number to 128,057. 88 patients deceased, bringing the tally to 7,505. 488 municipalities and regencies had reported at least one positive case.
 Indonesia's long-term immigration pass holders would be banned to enter Malaysia.
 Garuda Indonesia resumed flights from and to China as both countries celebrated the 70th anniversary of diplomatic relations. The flight frequency is limited to once per week.
 2 September
 2,301,268 specimens had been tested from 1,333,985 people. There were 81,757 suspected cases.
 Indonesia confirmed 3,075 new cases, bringing the total number to 180,646. 1,914 patients recovered, bringing the total number to 129,971. 111 patients deceased, bringing the tally to 7,616. 488 municipalities and regencies had reported at least one positive case.
 3 September
 2,338,865 specimens had been tested from 1,353,291 people; a record-breaking 37,597 tests were conducted in the previous 24 hours. There were 84,071 suspected cases.
 Indonesia confirmed a record-breaking 3,622 new cases, bringing the total number to 184,268. 2,084 patients recovered, bringing the total number to 132,055. 134 patients deceased – the most since 22 July, bringing the tally to 7,750. 488 municipalities and regencies had reported at least one positive case.
 Jakarta broke its own record for most new cases per province in 24 hours, adding 1,359 to their numbers.
 22 employees of Bridgestone factory in Bekasi were tested positive for COVID-19. This was the fourth factory cluster in the Greater Bekasi area – both the city and the regency – in the past two weeks, rising concern on the safety of the industry.
 4 September
 2,375,133 specimens had been tested from 1,371,391 people. There were 85,178 suspected cases.
 Indonesia confirmed 3,269 new cases, bringing the total number to 187,537. 2,126 patients recovered, bringing the total number to 134,181. 82 patients deceased, bringing the tally to 7,832. 489 municipalities and regencies had reported at least one positive case.
 5 September
 2,405,773 specimens had been tested from 1,388,288 people. There were 86,778 suspected cases.
 Indonesia confirmed 3,128 new cases, bringing the total number to 190,665. 2,220 patients recovered, bringing the total number to 136,401. 108 patients deceased, bringing the tally to 7,940. 489 municipalities and regencies had reported at least one positive case.
 6 September
 2,433,752 specimens had been tested from 1,401,513 people. There were 89,701 suspected cases.
 Indonesia confirmed 3,444 new cases, bringing the total number to 194,109. 2,174 patients recovered, bringing the total number to 138,575. 85 patients deceased, bringing the tally to 8,025. 489 municipalities and regencies had reported at least one positive case.
 7 September
 2,452,164 specimens had been tested from 1,417,694 people. There were 89,992 suspected cases.
 Indonesia confirmed 2,880 new cases, bringing the total number to 196,989. 2,077 patients recovered, bringing the total number to 140,652. 105 patients deceased, bringing the tally to 8,130. 489 municipalities and regencies had reported at least one positive case.
 The General Elections Commission announced that 37 local election candidates from 21 provinces were tested positive for COVID-19.
 8 September
 2,484,807 specimens had been tested from 1,434,294 people. There were 90,952 suspected cases.
 Indonesia confirmed 3,046 new cases, bringing the total number to 200,035. 2,306 patients recovered, bringing the total number to 142,958. 100 patients deceased, bringing the tally to 8,230. 489 municipalities and regencies had reported at least one positive case.
 As of this date, 59 countries had banned Indonesians from entering their borders. The Centers for Disease Control and Prevention also raised its warning level to the highest level 3 and advised Americans to avoid nonessential travel to Indonesia.
 9 September
 2,514,670 specimens had been tested from 1,449,629 people. There were 92,330 suspected cases.
 Indonesia confirmed 3,307 new cases, bringing the total number to 203,342. 2,242 patients recovered, bringing the total number to 145,200. 106 patients deceased, bringing the tally to 8,336. 489 municipalities and regencies had reported at least one positive case.
 Governor of Jakarta, Anies Baswedan, decided to reimpose large-scale social restrictions starting from 14 September due to the high spike of COVID-19 cases in the province.
 10 September
 2,549,579 specimens had been tested from 1,469,943 people. There were 95,501 suspected cases.
 Indonesia confirmed a record-breaking 3,861 new cases, bringing the total number to 207,203. 2,310 patients recovered, bringing the total number to 147,510. 120 patients deceased, bringing the tally to 8,456. 489 municipalities and regencies had reported at least one positive case.
 11 September
 2,581,433 specimens had been tested from 1,498,292 people. There were 94,886 suspected cases.
 Indonesia confirmed 3,737 new cases, bringing the total number to 210,940. 2,707 patients recovered, bringing the total number to 150,217. 88 patients deceased, bringing the tally to 8,544. 490 municipalities and regencies had reported at least one positive case.
 A restaurant in Semarang became a new cluster after 18 people were tested positive.
 12 September
 2,620,004 specimens had been tested from 1,523,214 people; a record-breaking 38,571 tests were conducted in the previous 24 hours. There were 95,539 suspected cases.
 Indonesia confirmed 3,806 new cases, bringing the total number to 214,746. 2,241 patients recovered, bringing the total number to 152,458. 106 patients deceased, bringing the tally to 8,650. 490 municipalities and regencies had reported at least one positive case.
 For the first time, all 34 provinces reported new cases in a single day.
 More than 27 million students, teachers, and lecturers would receive free internet subsidy for online learning.
 13 September
 2,650,104 specimens had been tested from 1,549,352 people. There were 97,227 suspected cases.
 Indonesia confirmed 3,636 new cases, bringing the total number to 218,382. 2,552 patients recovered, bringing the total number to 155,010. 73 patients deceased, bringing the tally to 8,723. 490 municipalities and regencies had reported at least one positive case.
 Jakarta broke its own record for most new cases per province in 24 hours, adding 1,380 to their numbers.
 14 September
 2,672,710 specimens had been tested from 1,569,545 people. There were 98,842 suspected cases.
 Indonesia confirmed 3,141 new cases, bringing the total number to 221,523. 3,395 patients recovered, bringing the total number to 158,405. 118 patients deceased, bringing the tally to 8,841. 491 municipalities and regencies had reported at least one positive case.
 15 September
 2,715,346 specimens had been tested from 1,592,056 people; a record-breaking 42,636 tests were conducted in the previous 24 hours. There were 99,634 suspected cases.
 Indonesia confirmed 3,507 new cases, bringing the total number to 225,030. 2,660 patients recovered, bringing the total number to 161,065. 124 patients deceased, bringing the tally to 8,965. 493 municipalities and regencies had reported at least one positive case.
 16 September
 2,755,120 specimens had been tested from 1,622,769 people. There were 100,236 suspected cases.
 Indonesia confirmed a record-breaking 3,963 new cases, bringing the total number to 228,993. 3,036 patients recovered, bringing the total number to 164,101. 135 patients deceased, the most since 22 July, bringing the tally to 9,100. 493 municipalities and regencies had reported at least one positive case.
 250 health workers in Indonesia had contracted COVID-19.
 17 September
 2,796,924 specimens had been tested from 1,652,324 people. There were 103,209 suspected cases.
 Indonesia confirmed 3,635 new cases, bringing the total number to 232,628. 2,585 patients recovered, bringing the total number to 166,686. 122 patients deceased, bringing the tally to 9,222. 493 municipalities and regencies had reported at least one positive case.
 A visualization website which was made by the government of Jakarta showed the number of office clusters in the province, from the biggest to the smallest. Ironically, the Ministry of Health office came in first place with 139 people tested positive for the virus.
 18 September
 2,841,352 specimens had been tested from 1,676,648 people; a record-breaking 44,428 tests were conducted in the previous 24 hours. There were 104,866 suspected cases.
 Indonesia confirmed 3,891 new cases, bringing the total number to 236,519. A record-breaking 4,088 patients recovered, bringing the total number to 170,774. 114 patients deceased, bringing the tally to 9,336. 493 municipalities and regencies had reported at least one positive case.
 19 September
 2,885,895 specimens had been tested from 1,698,202 people; a record-breaking 44,543 tests were conducted in the previous 24 hours. There were 107,863 suspected cases.
 Indonesia confirmed a record-breaking 4,168 new cases, bringing the total number to 240,687. 3,576 patients recovered, bringing the total number to 174,350. 112 patients deceased, bringing the tally to 9,448. 493 municipalities and regencies had reported at least one positive case.
 20 September
 2,922,648 specimens had been tested from 1,718,175 people. There were 107,370 suspected cases.
 Indonesia confirmed 3,989 new cases, bringing the total number to 244,676. 2,977 patients recovered, bringing the total number to 177,327. 105 patients deceased, bringing the tally to 9,553. 493 municipalities and regencies had reported at least one positive case.
 21 September
 2,950,173 specimens had been tested from 1,743,000 people. There were 108,880 suspected cases.
 Indonesia confirmed a record-breaking 4,176 new cases, bringing the total number to 248,852. 3,470 patients recovered, bringing the total number to 180,797. 124 patients deceased, bringing the tally to 9,677. 494 municipalities and regencies had reported at least one positive case.
 It was planned that the government would split comorbid and non-comorbid deaths related to COVID-19 to press the death numbers, especially in the province with the highest fatality rate, East Java.
 22 September
 2,994,069 specimens had been tested from 1,774,065 people. There were 109,721 suspected cases.
 Indonesia confirmed 4,071 new cases, bringing the total number to 252,923. 3,501 patients recovered, bringing the total number to 184,298. A record-breaking 160 patients deceased, bringing the tally to 9,837. 494 municipalities and regencies had reported at least one positive case.
 23 September
 3,032,250 specimens had been tested from 1,799,563 people. There were 109,541 suspected cases.
 Indonesia confirmed a record-breaking 4,465 new cases, bringing the total number to 257,388. 3,660 patients recovered, bringing the total number to 187,958. 140 patients deceased, bringing the tally to 9,977. 494 municipalities and regencies had reported at least one positive case.
 24 September
 3,074,814 specimens had been tested from 1,834,349 people. There were 110,910 suspected cases.
 For the second day in a row, Indonesia confirmed a record-breaking number of new cases; 4,634 to be exact, bringing the total number to 262,022. 3,895 patients recovered, bringing the total number to 191,853. 128 patients deceased, bringing the tally to 10,105. 494 municipalities and regencies had reported at least one positive case.
 25 September
 3,120,947 specimens had been tested from 1,860,768 people; a record-breaking 46,133 tests were conducted in the previous 24 hours. There were 112,082 suspected cases.
 For the third day in a row, Indonesia confirmed a record-breaking number of new cases; 4,823 to be exact, bringing the total number to 266,845. A record-breaking 4,343 patients recovered, bringing the total number to 196,196. 113 patients deceased, bringing the tally to 10,218. 494 municipalities and regencies had reported at least one positive case.
 Thousands of rooms in more than 93 hotels in nine priority provinces have been prepared to isolate COVID-19 patients.
 26 September
 3,169,783 specimens had been tested from 1,886,426 people; a record-breaking 48,836 tests were conducted in the previous 24 hours. There were 119,379 suspected cases.
 Indonesia confirmed 4,494 new cases, bringing the total number to 271,339. 3,207 patients recovered, bringing the total number to 199,403. 90 patients deceased, bringing the tally to 10,308. 495 municipalities and regencies had reported at least one positive case.
 Indonesian police finally arrested a man for sexually abusing and frauding a woman who wanted to perform rapid test in Soekarno–Hatta International Airport, Jakarta. This gained media attention after the story went viral and many people questioned the effectiveness of the requirement of rapid test before flying.
 27 September
 3,207,055 specimens had been tested from 1,907,226 people. There were 129,553 suspected cases.
 Indonesia confirmed 3,874 new cases, bringing the total number to 275,213. 3,611 patients recovered, bringing the total number to 203,014. 78 patients deceased, bringing the tally to 10,386. 497 municipalities and regencies had reported at least one positive case.
 28 September
 3,239,244 specimens had been tested from 1,934,863 people. There were 131,361 suspected cases.
 Indonesia confirmed 3,509 new cases, bringing the total number to 278,722. 3,856 patients recovered, bringing the total number to 206,870. 87 patients deceased, bringing the tally to 10,473. 497 municipalities and regencies had reported at least one positive case.
 The government announced they will start to distribute COVID-19 vaccine in January 2021 within five steps for a target of 102.45 million people.
 Out of 2,333 Bank Permata's fixed employees and outsources, 3.7% were tested positive for COVID-19 and were asymptomatic.
 29 September
 3,276,402 specimens had been tested from 1,962,754 people. There were 132,496 suspected cases.
 Indonesia confirmed 4,002 new cases, bringing the total number to 282,724. 3,567 patients recovered, bringing the total number to 210,437. 128 patients deceased, bringing the tally to 10,601. 497 municipalities and regencies had reported at least one positive case.
 30 September
 3,321,898 specimens had been tested from 1,993,694 people. There were 132,693 suspected cases.
 Indonesia confirmed 4,284 new cases, bringing the total number to 287,008. A record-breaking 4,510 patients recovered, bringing the total number to 214,947. 139 patients deceased, bringing the tally to 10,740. 497 municipalities and regencies had reported at least one positive case.

October 
 1 October
 3,365,490 specimens had been tested from 2,023,990 people. There were 135,480 suspected cases.
 Indonesia confirmed 4,174 new cases, bringing the total number to 291,182. 3,540 patients recovered, bringing the total number to 218,487. 116 patients deceased, bringing the tally to 10,856. 497 municipalities and regencies had reported at least one positive case.
 2 October
 3,407,911 specimens had been tested from 2,050,821 people. There were 135,348 suspected cases.
 Indonesia confirmed 4,317 new cases, bringing the total number to 295,499. 2,853 patients recovered, bringing the total number to 221,340. 116 patients deceased, bringing the tally to 10,972. 497 municipalities and regencies had reported at least one positive case.
 A video of people swimming and partying at a pool in Hairos Waterpark, Deli Serdang, North Sumatra went viral on the internet. It turned out that there was a 50% ticket discount and the pool had around 750 people at the same time, almost doubled the maximum capacity which was 400 people.
 3 October
 3,451,398 specimens had been tested from 2,074,943 people. There were 139,099 suspected cases.
 Indonesia confirmed 4,007 new cases, bringing the total number to 299,506. 3,712 patients recovered, bringing the total number to 225,052. 83 patients deceased, bringing the tally to 11,055. 497 municipalities and regencies had reported at least one positive case.
 4 October
 3,488,141 specimens had been tested from 2,096,584 people. There were 139,401 suspected cases.
 Indonesia confirmed 3,992 new cases, bringing the total number to 303,498. 3,401 patients recovered, bringing the total number to 228,453. 96 patients deceased, bringing the tally to 11,151. 497 municipalities and regencies had reported at least one positive case.
 Jakarta broke its own record for most new cases per province in 24 hours, adding 1,398 to their numbers.
 5 October
 3,515,165 specimens had been tested from 2,119,355 people. There were 141,169 suspected cases.
 Indonesia confirmed 3,622 new cases, bringing the total number to 307,120. 4,140 patients recovered, bringing the total number to 232,593. 102 patients deceased, bringing the tally to 11,253. 498 municipalities and regencies had reported at least one positive case.
 6 October
 3,551,507 specimens had been tested from 2,145,508 people. There were 140,305 suspected cases.
 Indonesia confirmed 4,056 new cases, bringing the total number to 311,176. 3,844 patients recovered, bringing the total number to 236,437. 121 patients deceased, bringing the tally to 11,374. 498 municipalities and regencies had reported at least one positive case.
 18 members of the People's Representative Council were COVID-19 positive.
 7 October
 3,595,719 specimens had been tested from 2,177,675 people. There were 142,213 suspected cases.
 Indonesia confirmed 4,538 new cases, bringing the total number to 315,714. 3,854 patients recovered, bringing the total number to 240,291. 98 patients deceased, bringing the tally to 11,472. 498 municipalities and regencies had reported at least one positive case.
 8 October
 3,639,108 specimens had been tested from 2,210,576 people. There were 144,072 suspected cases.
 Indonesia confirmed a record-breaking 4,850 new cases, bringing the total number to 320,564. 3,769 patients recovered, bringing the total number to 244,060. 108 patients deceased, bringing the tally to 11,580. 499 municipalities and regencies had reported at least one positive case.
 9 October
 3,683,808 specimens had been tested from 2,249,694 people. There were 149,115 suspected cases.
 Indonesia confirmed 4,094 new cases, bringing the total number to 324,658. 3,607 patients recovered, bringing the total number to 247,667. 97 patients deceased, bringing the tally to 11,677. 500 municipalities and regencies had reported at least one positive case.
 Vice mayor of Bandung Yana Mulyana, reopened cinemas as he claimed the city has successfully contained the virus.
 10 October
 3,726,476 specimens had been tested from 2,283,369 people. There were 151,652 suspected cases.
 Indonesia confirmed 4,294 new cases, bringing the total number to 328,952. 3,814 patients recovered, bringing the total number to 251,481. 88 patients deceased, bringing the tally to 11,765. 500 municipalities and regencies had reported at least one positive case.
 11 October
 3,762,808 specimens had been tested from 2,305,532 people. There were 152,286 suspected cases.
 Indonesia confirmed 4,497 new cases, bringing the total number to 333,449. 3,546 patients recovered, bringing the total number to 255,027. 79 patients deceased, bringing the tally to 11,844. 500 municipalities and regencies had reported at least one positive case.
 Governor Anies Baswedan decided to loosen the large-scale social restrictions in Jakarta starting from 12 October.
 12 October
 3,802,093 specimens had been tested from 2,338,550 people. There were 154,532 suspected cases.
 Indonesia confirmed 3,267 new cases, bringing the total number to 336,716. 3,492 patients recovered, bringing the total number to 258,519. 91 patients deceased, bringing the tally to 11,935. 500 municipalities and regencies had reported at least one positive case.
 13 October
 3,852,511 specimens had been tested from 2,378,562 people; in the previous 24 hours, a record-breaking 50,418 tests were conducted to 40,012 people – another record-breaker. There were 153,822 suspected cases.
 Indonesia confirmed 3,906 new cases, bringing the total number to 340,622. A record-breaking 4,777 patients recovered, bringing the total number to 263,296. 92 patients deceased, bringing the tally to 12,027. 500 municipalities and regencies had reported at least one positive case.
 14 October
 3,892,904 specimens had been tested from 2,415,606 people. There were 154,420 suspected cases.
 Indonesia confirmed 4,127 new cases, bringing the total number to 344,749. 4,555 patients recovered, bringing the total number to 267,851. 129 patients deceased, bringing the tally to 12,156. 500 municipalities and regencies had reported at least one positive case.
 The Yogyakarta Palace reduced the number of its royal servants to 30 percent to prevent COVID-19 to spread within the building.
 15 October
 3,935,112 specimens had been tested from 2,449,725 people. There were 154,926 suspected cases.
 Indonesia confirmed 4,411 new cases, bringing the total number to 349,160. A record-breaking 5,810 patients recovered, bringing the total number to 273,661. 112 patients deceased, bringing the tally to 12,268. 500 municipalities and regencies had reported at least one positive case.
 Central Java recorded 2,223 recoveries in the last 24 hours, the most by a province.
 Indonesia overtook the Philippines as the country with the most number of cases in Southeast Asia, 69 days after it was surpassed.
 16 October
 3,976,653 specimens had been tested from 2,479,922 people. There were 157,672 suspected cases.
 Indonesia confirmed 4,301 new cases, bringing the total number to 353,461. 3,883 patients recovered, bringing the total number to 277,544. 79 patients deceased, bringing the tally to 12,347. 500 municipalities and regencies had reported at least one positive case.
 17 October
 4,019,958 specimens had been tested from 2,505,898 people. There were 158,700 suspected cases.
 Indonesia confirmed 4,301 new cases, bringing the total number to 357,762. 4,048 patients recovered, bringing the total number to 281,592. 84 patients deceased, bringing the tally to 12,431. 500 municipalities and regencies had reported at least one positive case.
 18 October
 4,056,336 specimens had been tested from 2,528,319 people. There were 159,715 suspected cases.
 Indonesia confirmed 4,105 new cases, bringing the total number to 361,867. 3,732 patients recovered, bringing the total number to 285,324. 80 patients deceased, bringing the tally to 12,511. 500 municipalities and regencies had reported at least one positive case.
 19 October
 4,092,595 specimens had been tested from 2,553,521 people. There were 162,410 suspected cases.
 Indonesia confirmed 3,373 new cases, bringing the total number to 365,240. 3,919 patients recovered, bringing the total number to 289,243. 106 patients deceased, bringing the tally to 12,617. 501 municipalities and regencies had reported at least one positive case.
 20 October
 4,123,624 specimens had been tested from 2,583,085 people. There were 160,740 suspected cases.
 Indonesia confirmed 3,602 new cases, bringing the total number to 368,842. 4,410 patients recovered, bringing the total number to 293,653. 117 patients deceased, bringing the tally to 12,734. 501 municipalities and regencies had reported at least one positive case.
 During his visit, Japanese prime minister Yoshihide Suga offered Indonesia ¥50 billion loan to fight COVID-19.
 21 October
 4,167,210 specimens had been tested from 2,613,682 people. There were 162,216 suspected cases.
 Indonesia confirmed 4,267 new cases, bringing the total number to 373,109. 3,856 patients recovered, bringing the total number to 297,509. 123 patients deceased, bringing the tally to 12,857. 501 municipalities and regencies had reported at least one positive case.
 Several cinemas in Jakarta had officially been reopened.
 22 October
 4,211,138 specimens had been tested from 2,647,094 people. There were 164,346 suspected cases.
 Indonesia confirmed 4,432 new cases, bringing the total number to 377,541. 3,497 patients recovered, bringing the total number to 301,006. 102 patients deceased, bringing the tally to 12,959. 501 municipalities and regencies had reported at least one positive case.
 The Coordinating Minister of Maritime and Investments Affairs, Luhut Binsar Pandjaitan, warned the governors of four provinces due to the increasing number of cases. They include East Kalimantan, Papua, Riau, and West Sumatra.
 23 October
 4,253,425 specimens had been tested from 2,679,774 people. There were 161,763 suspected cases.
 Indonesia confirmed 4,369 new cases, bringing the total number to 381,910. 4,094 patients recovered, bringing the total number to 305,100. 118 patients deceased, bringing the tally to 13,077. 501 municipalities and regencies had reported at least one positive case.
 24 October
 4,293,347 specimens had been tested from 2,711,239 people. There were 166,380 suspected cases.
 Indonesia confirmed 4,070 new cases, bringing the total number to 385,980. 4,119 patients recovered, bringing the total number to 309,219. 128 patients deceased, bringing the tally to 13,205. 501 municipalities and regencies had reported at least one positive case.
 25 October
 4,327,144 specimens had been tested from 2,730,231 people. There were 168,918 suspected cases.
 Indonesia confirmed 3,732 new cases, bringing the total number to 389,712. 4,545 patients recovered, bringing the total number to 313,764. 94 patients deceased, bringing the tally to 13,299. 501 municipalities and regencies had reported at least one positive case.
 26 October
 4,351,557 specimens had been tested from 2,749,269 people. There were 170,163 suspected cases.
 Indonesia confirmed 3,222 new cases, bringing the total number to 392,934. 3,908 patients recovered, bringing the total number to 317,672. 112 patients deceased, bringing the tally to 13,411. 502 municipalities and regencies had reported at least one positive case.
 The Ministry of Transportation erased the requirement of rapid test for travellers by land transport to all provinces except for Bali.
 27 October
 4,388,995 specimens had been tested from 2,777,969 people. There were 169,479 suspected cases.
 Indonesia confirmed 3,520 new cases, bringing the total number to 396,454. 4,576 patients recovered, bringing the total number to 322,248. 101 patients deceased, bringing the tally to 13,512. 502 municipalities and regencies had reported at least one positive case.
 There were six institutes that were working on the COVID-19 vaccine in Indonesia.
 28 October
 4,429,567 specimens had been tested from 2,805,313 people. There were 169,833 suspected cases.
 Indonesia confirmed 4,029 new cases, bringing the total number to 400,483. 3,545 patients recovered, bringing the total number to 325,793. 100 patients deceased, bringing the tally to 13,612. 502 municipalities and regencies had reported at least one positive case.
 29 October
 4,463,884 specimens had been tested from 2,830,706 people. There were 68,888 suspected cases.
 Indonesia confirmed 3,565 new cases, bringing the total number to 404,048. 3,985 patients recovered, bringing the total number to 329,778. 89 patients deceased, bringing the tally to 13,701. 502 municipalities and regencies had reported at least one positive case.
 The number of suspected cases had a significant decrease due to some provinces reported the cumulative suspected cases and not the active ones.
 30 October
 4,488,738 specimens had been tested from 2,853,984 people. There were 68,292 suspected cases.
 Indonesia confirmed 2,897 new cases, bringing the total number to 406,945. 4,517 patients recovered, bringing the total number to 334,295. 81 patients deceased, bringing the tally to 13,782. 502 municipalities and regencies had reported at least one positive case.
 31 October
 4,517,739 specimens had been tested from 2,881,443 people. There were 67,900 suspected cases.
 Indonesia confirmed 3,143 new cases, bringing the total number to 410,088. 3,506 patients recovered, bringing the total number to 337,801. 87 patients deceased, bringing the tally to 13,869. 502 municipalities and regencies had reported at least one positive case.

November 
 1 November
 4,540,947 specimens had been tested from 2,899,414 people. There were 61,215 suspected cases.
 Indonesia confirmed 2,696 new cases, bringing the total number to 412,784. 4,141 patients recovered, bringing the total number to 341,942. 74 patients deceased, bringing the tally to 13,943. 502 municipalities and regencies had reported at least one positive case.
 2 November
 4,567,608 specimens had been tested from 2,919,560 people. There were 59,500 suspected cases.
 Indonesia confirmed 2,618 new cases, bringing the total number to 415,402. 3,624 patients recovered, bringing the total number to 345,566. 101 patients deceased, bringing the tally to 14,044. 502 municipalities and regencies had reported at least one positive case.
 3 November
 4,597,536 specimens had been tested from 2,941,778 people. There were 56,039 suspected cases.
 Indonesia confirmed 2,973 new cases, bringing the total number to 418,375. 3,931 patients recovered, bringing the total number to 349,497. 102 patients deceased, bringing the tally to 14,146. 502 municipalities and regencies had reported at least one positive case.
 4 November
 4,638,515 specimens had been tested from 2,969,883 people. There were 56,967 suspected cases.
 Indonesia confirmed 3,356 new cases, bringing the total number to 421,731. 3,785 patients recovered, bringing the total number to 353,282. 113 patients deceased, bringing the tally to 14,259. 502 municipalities and regencies had reported at least one positive case.
 5 November
 4,678,096 specimens had been tested from 3,001,189 people. There were 55,943 suspected cases.
 Indonesia confirmed 4,065 new cases, bringing the total number to 425,796. 3,860 patients recovered, bringing the total number to 357,142. 89 patients deceased, bringing the tally to 14,348. 502 municipalities and regencies had reported at least one positive case.
 The World Health Organization invited the Minister of Health Terawan Agus Putranto to talk about the COVID-19 situation in Indonesia.
 17 vendors of the Kupu Market in Tegal, Central Java  were tested positive for the virus.
 6 November
 4,716,187 specimens had been tested from 3,030,661 people. There were 56,663 suspected cases.
 Indonesia confirmed 3,778 new cases, bringing the total number to 429,574. 3,563 patients recovered, bringing the total number to 360,705. 94 patients deceased, bringing the tally to 14,442. 502 municipalities and regencies had reported at least one positive case.
 Jakarta no longer had any red zones, although Anies Baswedan said the province is not safe yet.
 7 November
 4,754,436 specimens had been tested from 3,059,777 people. There were 56,461 suspected cases.
 Indonesia confirmed 4,262 new cases, bringing the total number to 433,836. 3,712 patients recovered, bringing the total number to 364,417. 98 patients deceased, bringing the tally to 14,540. 503 municipalities and regencies had reported at least one positive case.
 8 November
 4,793,024 specimens had been tested from 3,080,718 people. There were 57,043 suspected cases.
 Indonesia confirmed 3,880 new cases, bringing the total number to 437,716. 3,881 patients recovered, bringing the total number to 368,298. 74 patients deceased, bringing the tally to 14,614. 503 municipalities and regencies had reported at least one positive case.
 9 November
 4,824,389 specimens had been tested from 3,105,465 people. There were 57,925 suspected cases.
 Indonesia confirmed 2,853 new cases, bringing the total number to 440,569. 3,968 patients recovered, bringing the total number to 372,266. 75 patients deceased, bringing the tally to 14,689. 503 municipalities and regencies had reported at least one positive case.
 Pilgrims will now have to perform swab test in Saudi Arabia before returning to Indonesia.
 10 November
 4,857,452 specimens had been tested from 3,137,485 people. There were 55,560 suspected cases.
 Indonesia confirmed 3,779 new cases, bringing the total number to 444,348. 3,475 patients recovered, bringing the total number to 375,741. 72 patients deceased, bringing the tally to 14,761. 503 municipalities and regencies had reported at least one positive case.
 11 November
 4,896,793 specimens had been tested from 3,175,096 people. There were 55,982 suspected cases.
 Indonesia confirmed 3,770 new cases, bringing the total number to 448,118. 3,241 patients recovered, bringing the total number to 378,982. 75 patients deceased, bringing the tally to 14,836. 503 municipalities and regencies had reported at least one positive case.
 12 November
 4,938,958 specimens had been tested from 3,211,592 people. There were 56,868 suspected cases.
 Indonesia confirmed 4,173 new cases, bringing the total number to 452,291. 3,102 patients recovered, bringing the total number to 382,084. 97 patients deceased, bringing the tally to 14,933. 505 municipalities and regencies had reported at least one positive case.
 13 November
 4,981,291 specimens had been tested from 3,249,484 people. There were 58,896 suspected cases.
 Indonesia confirmed a record-breaking 5,444 new cases, bringing the total number to 457,735. 3,010 patients recovered, bringing the total number to 385,094. 104 patients deceased, bringing the tally to 15,037. 505 municipalities and regencies had reported at least one positive case.
 With 1,362 cases, Central Java became the second province that ever reported more than 1,000 cases in a single day.
 14 November
 5,022,627 specimens had been tested from 3,288,194 people. There were 61,975 suspected cases.
 Indonesia confirmed 5,272 new cases, bringing the total number to 463,007. 3,000 patients recovered, bringing the total number to 388,094. 111 patients deceased, bringing the tally to 15,148. 505 municipalities and regencies had reported at least one positive case.
 Indonesia's COVID-19 taskforce delivered 20,000 masks to prevent the virus spreading within the wedding party of Muhammad Rizieq Shihab's daughter. However, this act was harshly criticized by the public as it unintentionally showed the government was not strict and accepted the large-scale wedding being held amid the pandemic.
 15 November
 5,055,488 specimens had been tested from 3,313,590 people. There were 63,380 suspected cases.
 Indonesia confirmed 4,106 new cases, bringing the total number to 467,113. 3,897 patients recovered, bringing the total number to 391,991. 63 patients deceased, bringing the tally to 15,211. 505 municipalities and regencies had reported at least one positive case.
 Muhammad Rizieq Shihab was fined Rp50 million for not implementing health protocol during his daughter's wedding reception.
 16 November
 5,090,127 specimens had been tested from 3,341,160 people. There were 63,683 suspected cases.
 Indonesia confirmed 3,535 new cases, bringing the total number to 470,648. 3,452 patients recovered, bringing the total number to 395,443. 85 patients deceased, bringing the tally to 15,296. 505 municipalities and regencies had reported at least one positive case.
 17 November
 5,129,899 specimens had been tested from 3,377,716 people. There were 64,928 suspected cases.
 Indonesia confirmed 3,807 new cases, bringing the total number to 474,455. 3,193 patients recovered, bringing the total number to 398,636. 97 patients deceased, bringing the tally to 15,393. 505 municipalities and regencies had reported at least one positive case.
 18 November
 5,171,841 specimens had been tested from 3,415,613 people. There were 64,430 suspected cases.
 Indonesia confirmed 4,265 new cases, bringing the total number to 478,720. 3,711 patients recovered, bringing the total number to 402,347. 110 patients deceased, bringing the tally to 15,503. 505 municipalities and regencies had reported at least one positive case.
 19 November
 5,219,471 specimens had been tested from 3,456,835 people. There were 63,546 suspected cases.
 Indonesia confirmed 4,798 new cases, bringing the total number to 483,518. 4,265 patients recovered, bringing the total number to 406,612. 97 patients deceased, bringing the tally to 15,600. 505 municipalities and regencies had reported at least one positive case.
 20 November
 5,261,426 specimens had been tested from 3,496,039 people. There were 63,074 suspected cases.
 Indonesia confirmed 4,792 new cases, bringing the total number to 488,310. 3,940 patients recovered, bringing the total number to 410,552. 78 patients deceased, bringing the tally to 15,678. 505 municipalities and regencies had reported at least one positive case.
 80 vendors of the Sidoharjo Market in Wonogiri Regency, Central Java were tested positive for the virus.
 Minister of Education and Culture Nadiem Makarim allowed local government to reopen schools in January 2021.
 21 November
 5,304,548 specimens had been tested from 3,526,607 people. There were 64,317 suspected cases.
 Indonesia confirmed 4,998 new cases, bringing the total number to 493,308. 3,403 patients recovered, bringing the total number to 413,955. 96 patients deceased, bringing the tally to 15,774. 505 municipalities and regencies had reported at least one positive case.
 Jakarta broke its own record for most new cases per province in 24 hours, adding 1,579 to their numbers.
 22 November
 5,340,537 specimens had been tested from 3,553,142 people. There were 64,502 suspected cases.
 Indonesia confirmed 4,360 new cases, bringing the total number to 497,668. 4,233 patients recovered, bringing the total number to 418,188. 110 patients deceased, bringing the tally to 15,884. 505 municipalities and regencies had reported at least one positive case.
 23 November
 5,380,620 specimens had been tested from 3,580,476 people. There were 66,279 suspected cases.
 Indonesia confirmed 4,442 new cases, bringing the total number to 502,110. 4,198 patients recovered, bringing the total number to 422,386. 118 patients deceased, bringing the tally to 16,002. 505 municipalities and regencies had reported at least one positive case.
 Indonesia became the 21st country in the world to pass half a million cases, 267 days after its first confirmed cases.
 24 November
 5,420,591 specimens had been tested from 3,608,244 people. There were 64,414 suspected cases.
 Indonesia confirmed 4,192 new cases, bringing the total number to 506,302. 2,927 patients recovered, bringing the total number to 425,313. 109 patients deceased, bringing the tally to 16,111. 505 municipalities and regencies had reported at least one positive case.
 25 November
 5,465,921 specimens had been tested from 3,651,964 people; in the previous 24 hours, tests were conducted to a record-breaking 43,720 people. There were 65,438 suspected cases.
 Indonesia confirmed a record-breaking 5,534 new cases, bringing the total number to 511,836. 4,494 patients recovered, bringing the total number to 429,807. 114 patients deceased, bringing the tally to 16,225. 505 municipalities and regencies had reported at least one positive case.
 26 November
 5,517,392 specimens had been tested from 3,690,126 people; in the previous 24 hours, a record-breaking 51,471 tests were conducted. There were 66,685 suspected cases.
 Indonesia confirmed 4,917 new cases, bringing the total number to 516,753. 3,842 patients recovered, bringing the total number to 433,649. 127 patients deceased, bringing the tally to 16,352. 505 municipalities and regencies had reported at least one positive case.
 Swab tests were conducted to 5,000 students in Surabaya before the city reopens schools.
 27 November
 5,566,215 specimens had been tested from 3,729,561 people. There were 67,836 suspected cases.
 Indonesia confirmed a record-breaking 5,828 new cases, bringing the total number to 522,581. 3,807 patients recovered, bringing the total number to 437,456. A record number of 169 patients deceased, bringing the tally to 16,521. 505 municipalities and regencies had reported at least one positive case.
 28 November
 5,612,789 specimens had been tested from 3,766,860 people. There were 68,606 suspected cases.
 Indonesia confirmed 5,418 new cases, bringing the total number to 527,999. 4,527 patients recovered, bringing the total number to 441,983. 125 patients deceased, bringing the tally to 16,646. 505 municipalities and regencies had reported at least one positive case.
 29 November
 5,655,692 specimens had been tested from 3,797,881 people. There were 70,792 suspected cases.
 Indonesia confirmed a record-breaking 6,267 new cases, bringing the total number to 534,266. 4,527 patients recovered, bringing the total number to 445,793. A joint-record of 169 patients deceased, bringing the tally to 16,815. 505 municipalities and regencies had reported at least one positive case.
 Central Java became the first province to report more than 2,000 cases in a day. With 2,036 cases and 73 deaths, it held the record of the highest numbers of cases and deaths per province in 24 hours. In addition, the province was also holding the daily recovery record (2,233 on 15 October) and per this day had the highest ever number of active cases in an Indonesian province with 14,376.
 30 November
 5,695,747 specimens had been tested from 3,827,720 people. There were 72,786 suspected cases.
 Indonesia confirmed 4,617 new cases, bringing the total number to 538,883. 4,725 patients recovered, bringing the total number to 450,518. 130 patients deceased, bringing the tally to 16,945. 505 municipalities and regencies had reported at least one positive case.
 Bangka Belitung Islands became the last province to exceed 1,000 cases.

December 
 1 December
 5,746,979 specimens had been tested from 3,865,412 people. There were 71,286 suspected cases.
 Indonesia confirmed 5,092 new cases, bringing the total number to 543,975. 4,361 patients recovered, bringing the total number to 454,879. 136 patients deceased, bringing the tally to 17,081. 505 municipalities and regencies had reported at least one positive case.
 Governor of Jakarta Anies Baswedan became the fourth governor to be announced COVID-19 positive after Governor of Riau Islands , Governor of West Kalimantan Sutarmidji, and Governor of Central Kalimantan Sugianto Sabran. On the same day, Governor of Riau Syamsuar was also tested positive for the virus.
 2 December
 5,805,224 specimens had been tested from 3,907,273 people; in the previous 24 hours, a record-breaking 58,245 tests were conducted. There were 71,074 suspected cases.
 Indonesia confirmed 5,533 new cases, bringing the total number to 549,508. 4,001 patients recovered, bringing the total number to 458,880. 118 patients deceased, bringing the tally to 17,199. 507 municipalities and regencies had reported at least one positive case.
 3 December
 5,867,621 specimens had been tested from 3,952,752 people; in the previous 24 hours, a record-breaking 62,397 tests were conducted to 45,479 people – another record-breaker. There were 69,027 suspected cases.
 Indonesia confirmed a record-breaking 8,369 new cases, bringing the total number to 557,877. 4,540 patients recovered, bringing the total number to 462,553. 156 patients deceased, bringing the tally to 17,355. 507 municipalities and regencies had reported at least one positive case.
 Papua and West Java reported 1,755 and 1,648 cases respectively, the second and third most daily cases by a province after Central Java's 2,036 cases recorded on 29 November.
 Ministress of Manpower Ida Fauziyah was tested positive for the virus. She became the fourth minister in the current cabinet to be declared COVID-19 positive after Minister of Transportation Budi Karya Sumadi, the now-resigned Minister of Maritime Affairs and Fisheries Edhy Prabowo, and Minister of Religion Affairs Fachrul Razi.
 4 December
 5,926,986 specimens had been tested from 3,992,487 people. There were 69,016 suspected cases.
 Indonesia confirmed 5,803 new cases, bringing the total number to 563,680. 3,625 patients recovered, bringing the total number to 466,178. 124 patients deceased, bringing the tally to 17,479. 507 municipalities and regencies had reported at least one positive case.
 5 December
 5,981,908 specimens had been tested from 4,029,428 people. There were 69,926 suspected cases.
 Indonesia confirmed 6,027 new cases, bringing the total number to 569,707. 4,271 patients recovered, bringing the total number to 470,449. 110 patients deceased, bringing the tally to 17,589. 508 municipalities and regencies had reported at least one positive case.
 6 December
 6,032,542 specimens had been tested from 4,058,033 people. There were 70,091 suspected cases.
 Indonesia confirmed 6,089 new cases, bringing the total number to 575,796. 4,322 patients recovered, bringing the total number to 474,771. 151 patients deceased, bringing the tally to 17,740. 508 municipalities and regencies had reported at least one positive case.
 1,2 million CoronaVac vaccines from China had arrived in Indonesia.
 Minister of Social Affairs Juliari Batubara was arrested in Jakarta for allegedly receiving bribes from suppliers of social assistance for COVID-19.
 7 December
 6,059,415 specimens had been tested from 4,079,605 people. There were 72,986 suspected cases.
 Indonesia confirmed 5,754 new cases, bringing the total number to 581,550. 4,431 patients recovered, bringing the total number to 479,202. 127 patients deceased, bringing the tally to 17,867. 508 municipalities and regencies had reported at least one positive case.
 The daily positivity rate hit 26.67%, the highest ever. This meant one out of four people tested was COVID-19 positive.
 Five teachers of Junior High School 3 Jekulo, Kudus, Central Java died from COVID-19 in just a span of two weeks.
 8 December
 6,112,234 specimens had been tested from 4,113,090 people. There were 70,450 suspected cases.
 Indonesia confirmed 5,292 new cases, bringing the total number to 586,842. 4,295 patients recovered, bringing the total number to 483,497. 133 patients deceased, bringing the tally to 18,000. 508 municipalities and regencies had reported at least one positive case.
 All six provinces on Java were in the top ten provinces with most active cases simultaneously, the first time in more than eight months.
 9 December
 6,168,268 specimens had been tested from 4,143,604 people. There were 69,879 suspected cases.
 Indonesia confirmed 6,058 new cases, bringing the total number to 592,900. 3,948 patients recovered, bringing the total number to 487,445. A record number of 171 patients deceased, bringing the tally to 18,171. 510 municipalities and regencies had reported at least one positive case.
 Local elections were held in nine provinces, 223 regencies (the election in Boven Digoel was postponed), and 37 cities amid the pandemic after its postponement from the initial schedule in September. Although health protocols were practiced, many people raised concern on the spike of new cases.
 10 December
 6,200,252 specimens had been tested from 4,176,266 people. There were 66,463 suspected cases.
 Indonesia confirmed 6,033 new cases, bringing the total number to 598,933. 4,530 patients recovered, bringing the total number to 491,975. 165 patients deceased, bringing the tally to 18,336. 510 municipalities and regencies had reported at least one positive case.
 11 December
 6,254,324 specimens had been tested from 4,216,052 people. There were 64,845 suspected cases.
 Indonesia confirmed 6,310 new cases, bringing the total number to 605,243. 4,911 patients recovered, bringing the total number to 496,886. A record number of 175 patients deceased, bringing the tally to 18,511. 510 municipalities and regencies had reported at least one positive case.
 12 December
 6,331,331 specimens had been tested from 4,253,821 people. There were 62,224 suspected cases.
 Indonesia confirmed 6,388 new cases, bringing the total number to 611,631. 4,490 patients recovered, bringing the total number to 501,376. 142 patients deceased, bringing the tally to 18,653. 510 municipalities and regencies had reported at least one positive case.
 13 December
 6,382,379 specimens had been tested from 4,279,168 people. There were 63,598 suspected cases.
 Indonesia confirmed 6,189 new cases, bringing the total number to 617,820. 4,460 patients recovered, bringing the total number to 505,836. 166 patients deceased, bringing the tally to 18,819. 510 municipalities and regencies had reported at least one positive case.
 Muhammad Rizieq Shihab was arrested for breaking health protocols and restrictions at some places last month, including his daughter's wedding reception.
 14 December
 6,424,385 specimens had been tested from 4,308,544 people. There were 64,067 suspected cases.
 Indonesia confirmed 5,489 new cases, bringing the total number to 623,309. 5,121 patients recovered, bringing the total number to 510,957. 137 patients deceased, bringing the tally to 18,956. 510 municipalities and regencies had reported at least one positive case.
 15 December
 6,485,085 specimens had been tested from 4,347,393 people. There were 63,666 suspected cases.
 Indonesia confirmed 6,120 new cases, bringing the total number to 629,429. 5,699 patients recovered, bringing the total number to 516,656. 155 patients deceased, bringing the tally to 19,111. 510 municipalities and regencies had reported at least one positive case.
 16 December
 6,546,376 specimens had been tested from 4,383,985 people. There were 62,364 suspected cases.
 Indonesia confirmed 6,725 new cases, bringing the total number to 636,154. 5,328 patients recovered, bringing the total number to 521,984. 137 patients deceased, bringing the tally to 19,248. 510 municipalities and regencies had reported at least one positive case.
 President Joko Widodo had volunteered to be the first person to be vaccinated in Indonesia. He also announced that the vaccine would be free for all citizens.
 Taiwan extended ban on Indonesian migrant workers for safety reason.
 17 December
 6,607,005 specimens had been tested from 4,427,446 people. There were 62,250 suspected cases.
 Indonesia confirmed 7,354 new cases, bringing the total number to 643,508. 4,995 patients recovered, bringing the total number to 526,979. 132 patients deceased, bringing the tally to 19,390. 510 municipalities and regencies had reported at least one positive case.
 Jakarta reported 1,690 cases, the third most daily cases by a province, beating West Java's 1,648 cases recorded on 3 December.
 Travellers who want to enter Jakarta and West Java would have to perform antigen rapid test. On the other hand, Bali required its visitors to perform swab test.
 18 December
 6,674,683 specimens had been tested from 4,465,960 people; in the previous 24 hours, a record-breaking 67,678 tests were conducted. There were 62,717 suspected cases.
 Indonesia confirmed 6,689 new cases, bringing the total number to 650,197. 5,016 patients recovered, bringing the total number to 531,995. 124 patients deceased, bringing the tally to 19,514. 510 municipalities and regencies had reported at least one positive case.
 19 December
 6,738,451 specimens had been tested from 4,507,874 people. There were 64,071 suspected cases.
 Indonesia confirmed 7,751 new cases, bringing the total number to 657,948. 4,265 patients recovered, bringing the total number to 536,260. 145 patients deceased, bringing the tally to 19,659. 510 municipalities and regencies had reported at least one positive case.
 Jakarta reported 1,899 cases, the second most daily cases by a province, beating Papua's 1,755 cases recorded on 3 December.
 For the first time ever, the number of active cases exceeded 100,000 cases.
 20 December
 6,786,585 specimens had been tested from 4,536,711 people. There were 66,702 suspected cases.
 Indonesia confirmed 6,982 new cases, bringing the total number to 664,930. 5,551 patients recovered, bringing the total number to 541,811. A record number of 221 patients deceased, bringing the tally to 19,880. 510 municipalities and regencies had reported at least one positive case.
 21 December
 6,824,030 specimens had been tested from 4,561,464 people. There were 67,509 suspected cases.
 Indonesia confirmed 6,848 new cases, bringing the total number to 671,778. 5,073 patients recovered, bringing the total number to 546,884. 205 patients deceased, bringing the tally to 20,085. 510 municipalities and regencies had reported at least one positive case.
 The daily positivity rate hit 27.67%, the highest ever.
 Central Java reported 84 deaths, the most by a province within a span of 24 hours.
 22 December
 6,873,836 specimens had been tested from 4,592,232 people. There were 69,343 suspected cases.
 Indonesia confirmed 6,347 new cases, bringing the total number to 678,125. A record number of 5,838 patients recovered, bringing the total number to 552,722. 172 patients deceased, bringing the tally to 20,257. 510 municipalities and regencies had reported at least one positive case.
 President Joko Widodo announced that Minister of Health Terawan Agus Putranto would be replaced by a nuclear physics graduate and the First Deputy Minister of State-Owned Enterprises Budi Gunadi Sadikin, becoming the first post-1950s Indonesian Minister of Health to not graduate from medical school.
 23 December
 6,926,508 specimens had been tested from 4,625,786 people. There were 66,914 suspected cases.
 Indonesia confirmed 7,514 new cases, bringing the total number to 685,639. A record number of 5,981 patients recovered, bringing the total number to 558,703. 151 patients deceased, bringing the tally to 20,408. 510 municipalities and regencies had reported at least one positive case.
 Jakarta beat its own record by reporting 1,954 cases, the second highest new cases by a province in 24 hours.
 Sandiaga Uno was sworn in as Minister of Tourism and Creative Economy, becoming the first COVID-19 survivor to be a cabinet minister in Indonesia.
 The government had banned travellers from the United Kingdom due to the new mutation of coronavirus in the country.
 24 December
 6,987,576 specimens had been tested from 4,665,868 people. There were 68,219 suspected cases.
 Indonesia confirmed 7,199 new cases, bringing the total number to 692,838. 5,277 patients recovered, bringing the total number to 563,980. 181 patients deceased, bringing the tally to 20,589. 510 municipalities and regencies had reported at least one positive case.
 Sepuluh Nopember Institute of Technology ( or ITS) in Surabaya would be closed until 10 January 2021 due to the spike of COVID-19 cases.
 25 December
 7,037,969 specimens had been tested from 4,700,999 people. There were 67,464 suspected cases.
 Indonesia confirmed 7,259 new cases, bringing the total number to 700,097. A record number of 6,324 patients recovered, bringing the total number to 570,304. 258 patients deceased – also a record-breaker, bringing the tally to 20,847. 510 municipalities and regencies had reported at least one positive case.
 Jakarta reported 2,096 new cases in the last 24 hours, the highest by a province, beating Central Java's record on 29 November. On the other hand, Central Java beat the highest daily deaths record by reporting 91 new deaths, while East Java reported the second highest with 78.
 26 December
 7,082,550 specimens had been tested from 4,732,231 people. There were 68,061 suspected cases.
 Indonesia confirmed 6,740 new cases, bringing the total number to 706,837. For the second day in a row, there was record-breaking number of patients recovered; 6,389 on this day, bringing the total number to 576,693. 147 patients deceased, bringing the tally to 20,994. 510 municipalities and regencies had reported at least one positive case.
 27 December
 7,124,513 specimens had been tested from 4,761,656 people. There were 69,325 suspected cases.
 Indonesia confirmed 6,528 new cases, bringing the total number to 713,365. For the third day in a row, there was record-breaking number of patients recovered; 6,983 on this day, bringing the total number to 583,676. 243 patients deceased, bringing the tally to 21,237. 510 municipalities and regencies had reported at least one positive case.
 Top five provinces with the most active cases to this date were from Java region, the first time since April. All of them had more than 6,000 active cases and accounted around 57% of the national active cases.
 As of this date, 234 Nahdlatul Ulama's kyai had died from COVID-19.
 28 December
 7,159,309 specimens had been tested from 4,788,286 people. There were 69,156 suspected cases.
 Indonesia confirmed 5,854 new cases, bringing the total number to 719,219. 6,302 patients recovered, bringing the total number to 589,978. 215 patients deceased, bringing the tally to 21,452. 510 municipalities and regencies had reported at least one positive case.
 The government outlines its purchasing plan for Indonesia's upcoming vaccination program. A total of 664 million doses are planned, with 330 million on firm order and 334 million options. The firm order includes 125 million doses from Sinovac, 50 million from Oxford-AstraZeneca, 50 million from Novavax, 50 million from Pfizer-BioNTech and 54 million from the COVAX program.
 29 December
 7,224,452 specimens had been tested from 4,831,091 people. There were 68,181 suspected cases.
 Indonesia confirmed 7,903 new cases, bringing the total number to 727,122. 6,805 patients recovered, bringing the total number to 596,783. 251 patients deceased, bringing the tally to 21,703. 510 municipalities and regencies had reported at least one positive case.
 30 December
 7,297,374 specimens had been tested from 4,875,480 people; in the previous 24 hours, a record-breaking 72,922 tests were conducted. There were 67,615 suspected cases.
 Indonesia confirmed 8,002 new cases, bringing the total number to 735,124. 6,958 patients recovered, bringing the total number to 603,741. 241 patients deceased, bringing the tally to 21,944. 510 municipalities and regencies had reported at least one positive case.
 31 December
 7,355,174 specimens had been tested from 4,912,745 people. There were 68,316 suspected cases.
 Indonesia confirmed 8,074 new cases, bringing the total number to 743,198. A record number of 7,356 patients recovered, bringing the total number to 611,097. 194 patients deceased, bringing the tally to 22,138. 510 municipalities and regencies had reported at least one positive case.
 1,8 million CoronaVac vaccines had arrived in Indonesia. Along with another 1,2 million vaccines which had arrived earlier this month, all of them would be distributed to 34 provinces.

See also 
 2020 in Indonesia
 COVID-19 vaccination in Indonesia
 Statistics of the COVID-19 pandemic in Indonesia

References 

COVID-19 pandemic in Indonesia
Indonesia